= Timeline of Lleida =

The following is a timeline of the history of the city of Lleida in Catalonia, Spain.

== Prior to 20th century ==
- 216 BCE – Hanno II the Great was defeated by Scipio Africanus nearby.
- 49 BCE – Battle of Ilerda fought during Caesar's Civil War.
- 400-500 CE – Roman Catholic Diocese of Lleida established.
- 546 – Religious council held.
- 793 – The Franks in power.
- 797 – Re-taken by the Moors.
- 832 – Old Cathedral of Lleida rebuilt to serve as a mosque.
- 1039 – Muslim Taifa of Lérida begins.
- 1149 – Siege of Lleida puts Christian Ramon Berenguer IV, Count of Barcelona, in power.
- 1278 – Cathedral of St. Mary of La Seu Vella consecrated.
- 1300 – University of Lleida established by James II of Aragon.
- 1390 – Public clock installed (approximate date).
- 1445 – Arxiu Municipal de Lleida (city archives) active (approximate date).
- 1479 – Printing press in use.
- 1669 – Convento del Roser construction begins.
- 1707 – Siege of Lleida (1707) by French forces.
- 1717
  - University of Lleida closed by order of Philip V of Spain.
  - University of Cervera opened by order of Philip V of Spain.
- 1719 – Ayuntamiento de Lérida (government entity) established.
- 1781 – New Cathedral of Lleida built.
- 1810 – Lleida besieged by French forces.
- 1834 – Sociedad Económica de Amigos del País de Lerida established.
- 1835 – University of Cervera closed.
- 1842 – Population: 12,236.
- 1860 – Railway begins operating.
- 1864 – Parque de Los Campos Elíseos de Lérida (park) opens.

== 20th century ==
- 1900 – Population: 21,432.
- 1910 – Population: 24,531.
- 1912 – Exposició d'Artistes Lleidatans (art exhibit) held.
- 1915 – Cinema Vinyes built.^{(en)}
- 1917 – Museu d'Art Jaume Morera (museum) opens.
- 1924 – Balaguer-Lleida railway begins operating.
- 1938 – La Mañana newspaper begins publication.
- 1942 – Institut d'Estudis Ilerdencs established.
- 1950 – Population: 52,849.
- 1951 – Teatre Principal (theatre) active.
- 1952 – Archivo Histórico Provincial de Lérida (archives) established.
- 1981 – Population: 109,573.
- 1982 – Diari Segre newspaper begins publication.
- 1985 – Autobuses de Lérida begin operating.
- 1989 – CaixaForum Lleida established.
- 1992 – University of Lleida established.
- 1994 – Auditori Enric Granados (concert hall) built.
- 1995 – Lleida Latin-American Film Festival begins.
- 1998 – Teatre Municipal de l'Escorxador opens.

== 21st century ==
- 2004 – Àngel Ros becomes mayor.
- 2005 – Autoritat Territorial de la Mobilitat de l'Àrea de Lleida (regional transit entity) established.
- 2010 – La Llotja de Lleida (convention centre) opens.
- 2011 – Population: 137,283.
- 2021 – Catalan rapper and poet Pablo Hasél is jailed for Lèse-majesté, mass protests condemning the arrest

== See also ==
- History of Lleida
- List of mayors of Lleida
- List of bishops of Lleida
- Timeline of Catalan history

Other cities in the autonomous community of Catalonia:^{(ca)}

- Timeline of Barcelona

== Bibliography ==
- Abraham Rees (1819), "Lerida", The Cyclopaedia, London: Longman, Hurst, Rees, Orme & Brown
- Richard Ford (1890), "Lerida", Handbook for Travellers in Spain, vol. 2 (7th ed.), London: J. Murray, p. 506, hdl:2027/uva.x001198108
- "Lérida (city)" . Encyclopædia Britannica. Vol. 16 (11th ed.). 1910. pp. 483–484.
- "Lerida", Spain and Portugal (4th ed.), Leipzig: Karl Baedeker, 1913, p. 250, hdl:2027/uc2.ark:/13960/t5q81nw29 – via HathiTrust
