= Liceu Escolar de Lleida =

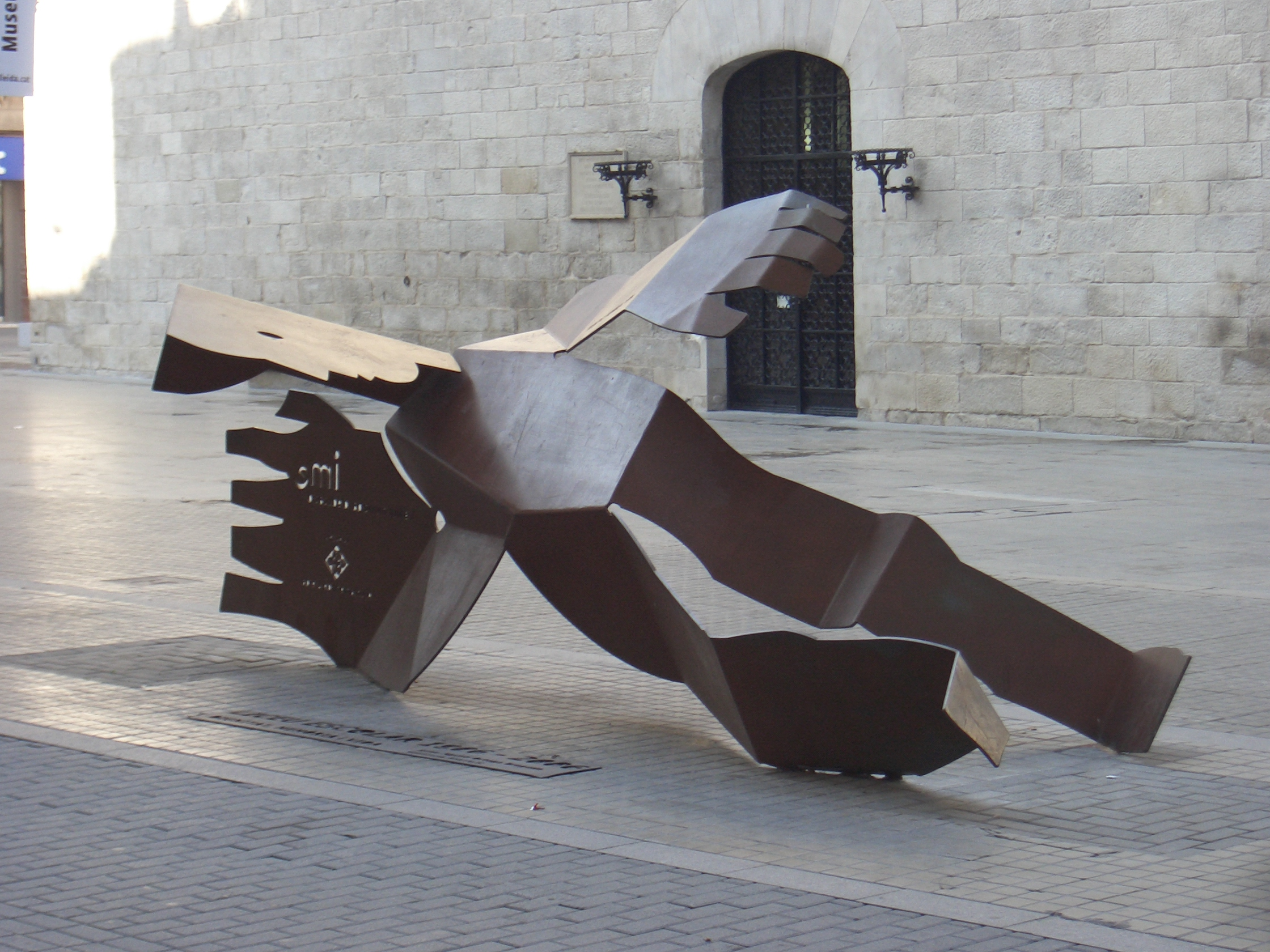
Monument.

The Liceu Escolar de Lleida was a school in Lleida, Catalonia, Spain founded by Frederic Godàs and Victorina Vila Badia in 1906, who wanted to introduce a modern, progressive pedagogy system, part of the New Catalan School movement, in the country's outdated and authoritarian school system. The Liceu Escolar is now famous for the Spanish Civil War November 2, 1937 bombing during which it was bombed by the Fascist Italian aviation, during which 12,000 kg. of bombs were dropped in the city, resulting in 700 casualties. 48 children and several teachers died during the raid in the school. It is still not exactly known if it the bombing of the Liceu was planned or a mistake.

Students include poet Màrius Torres. A monument by Agustín Ortega Bragado now commemorates the tragedy, on Avinguda Blondel, in front of the Institut d'Estudis Ilerdencs, the Institut Municipal d'Acció Cultural and CaixaForum Lleida.
