= Pardinyes =

Coordinates: 41°37′21″N 0°38′14″E

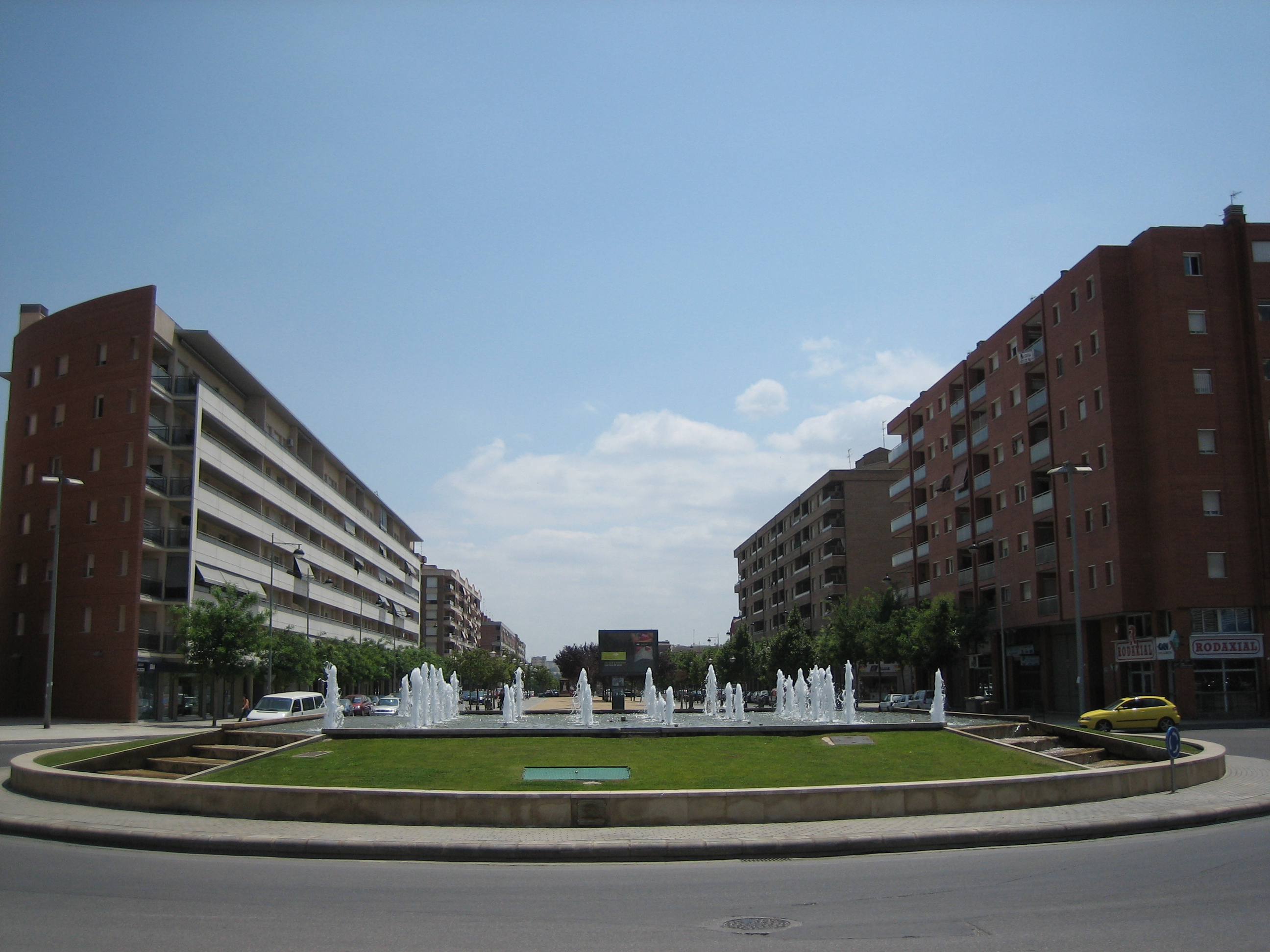
Fountain on Rambla de Pardinyes.

Pardinyes is a neighbourhood in Lleida (Catalonia, Spain). It is a 1920s to mid-20th century urban development grown out of new architecture built on former agricultural land between Balàfia and the River Segre. It was originally divided in Pardinyes Baixes and Pardinyes Altes, divided by the railroad tracks with the station Lleida Pirineus in the vicinity. The latter neighbourhood was initially populated by railway workers and later industrial workers, until in 1979 the freight train station was reconverted into public facilities and industry moved to other areas of the town. With some 12,000 inhabitants, it still retains a good deal of its village-ish aspect, specially at the right side of Rambla de Pardinyes.

The city's biggest park, La Mitjana, is part of Pardinyes. It is home to the football team CF Pardinyes. In 2010 the former peasants' market by the river, which had been closed and abandoned for years, was replaced by a theatre and convention centre called La Llotja de Lleida.

== Transport ==
The neighbourhood can be accessed from downtown using the bus lines number 4 and 5.
