= La Llotja de Lleida =

Theatre and congress centre in Lleida, Catalonia, Spain

- Interactive map of La Llotja de Lleida
- Address: Avinguda de Tortosa, 4
- Location: Lleida, Catalonia, Spain
- Coordinates: 41°37′12″N 0°38′18″E
- Owner: The Lleida City Council
- Operator: La Llotja de Lleida S.A.

Construction
- Built: 2007-2010
- Opened: 21 January 2010
- Construction cost: € 37 million

Website
- www.lallotjadelleida.cat

La Llotja de Lleida is a theatre and congress centre in Lleida (Catalonia, Spain). It opened its doors in January 2010, and is owned by the city council. Giuseppe Verdi's Il Trovatore premiered there on 21 January that year. Its two congress halls, called A and B, have capacity for 400 and 200 people, while the main auditory, Sala Ricard Vinyes, has 1000 seats. It's located in Pardinyes, next to the river Segre and the Lleida Pirineus railway station, on the site of a former municipal market.

The animation film festival Animac moved to La Llotja de Lleida in February 2010, on the occasion of its 14th edition.

On 23 March 2010, King Juan Carlos and Queen Sophia of Spain officially opened La Llotja de Lleida.

== Architecture ==
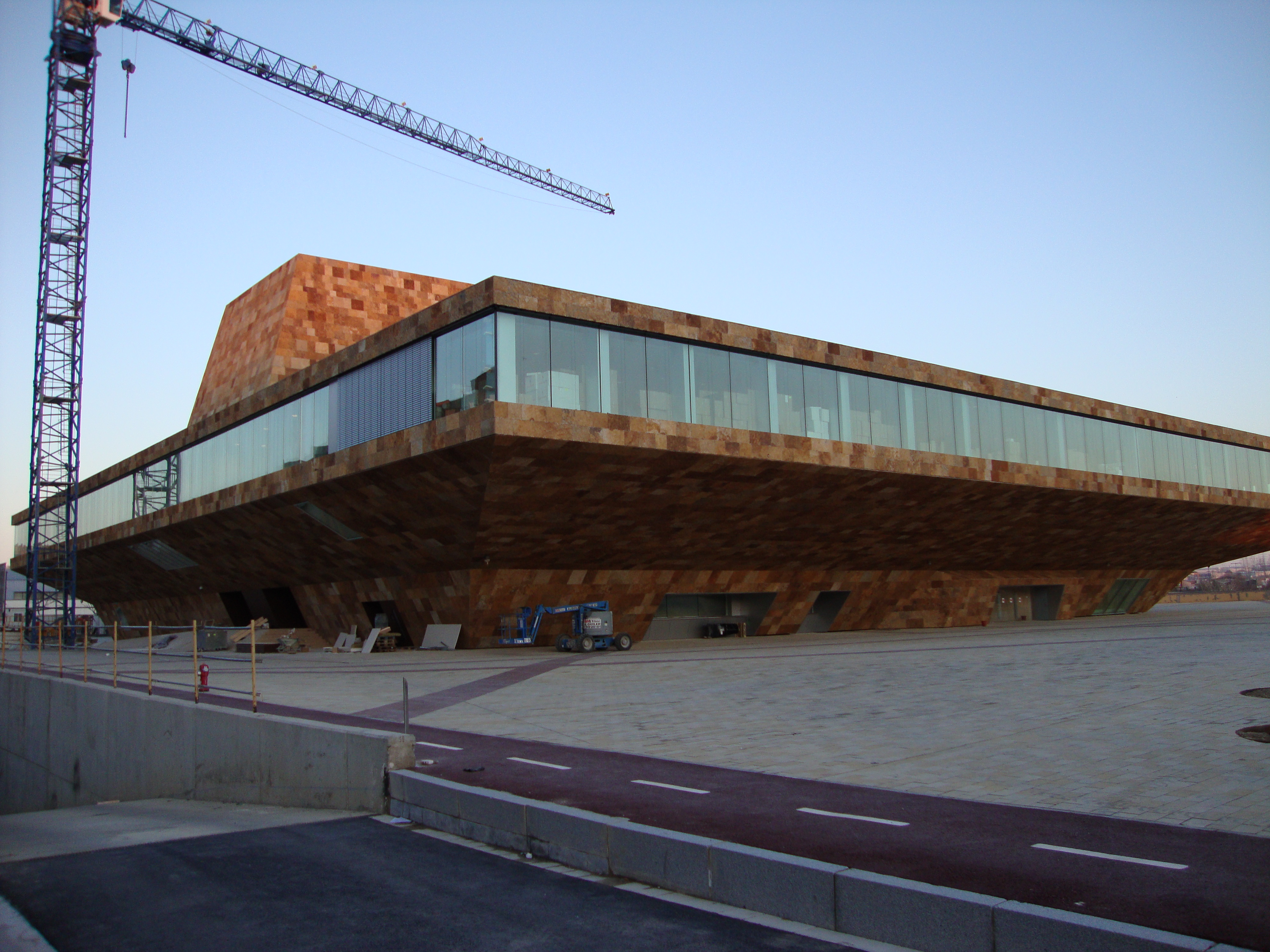
Construction work at La Llotja de Lleida, December 2009.

The building was designed by the Dutch architecture firm Mecanoo, from Delft. Mecanoo's design interprets the landscape of Lleida as the exciting scenery before which the building has been placed, somewhat further from the river. The mise-en-scène is elaborated on three levels of scale. Regarded from the large scale of the region, the building forms a link between the river and the mountain. Viewed from the urban scale, La Llotja and the river form a balanced composition. At street level the cantilevers of La Llotja de Lleida provide protection from sun and rain.

The large stone edifice seems to have sprouted from the Spanish earth. The building's horizontal form provides a large garden on the roof, while under the cantilevers begins a square for events, with the stairs of the adjacent building serving as a tribune. Parking has been created underground with the loading area for trucks on the ground level, the same level where the theatre stage, dressing rooms and restaurant kitchen are found.

Materials ensure distinction and orientation in the interior. The exterior is of stone. Inside there are mainly white, plastered walls and either wooden or marble floors. The entrance hall and the multi-functional hall have a marble floor, while the foyer has a floor of mixed hardwood. The theatre has the atmosphere of an orchard with walls of black wood in which trees of light have been cut out. Thousands of leaves on the ceiling light the hall. The colour palette of fruit is a theme that recurs in small details throughout the building. After all, the region of Lleida is famous for its fruit production. The roof is colourful: pergolas support a range of creepers and climbers like roses, jasmine and ivy. The garden with its mirador is not only pleasant but also useful since the roof cover keeps the building cool in the summer, provides a beautiful view for people living in the neighbourhood and serves an extra place for conference guests to sojourn.

The original plan of Lleida's city council was hiring renowned architect Rafael Moneo, who finally declined the offer, and a total of 7 different architect studios presented their proposals in 2004: Mecanoo, Foreign Office Architects headed by Alejandro Zaera-Polo, Josep Llinás, Elías Torres & Martínez Lapeña, Carlos Ferrater, Ramon Artigues, Ramon Sanabria, Ramon Maria Puig and Juan Navarro Baldeweg.

== Stated aims and criticism ==
Its construction was first proposed by the city council in order to increase the number of conventions and fairs in Lleida and to promote local private economy, as part of the ongoing renewal of many public services and infrastructure. Lleida was in 2009 the second Catalan city in terms of congresses, conventions and fairs after Barcelona. Skeptics have criticised the high public cost of the building, even opposing to its construction and proposing instead the refurbishment of the city's former main theatre, Teatre Principal.

== See also ==
- Auditori Enric Granados
- CaixaForum Lleida
- Culture in Lleida
