= Institut d'Estudis Ilerdencs =

Coordinates: 41.6129°N 0.6237°E

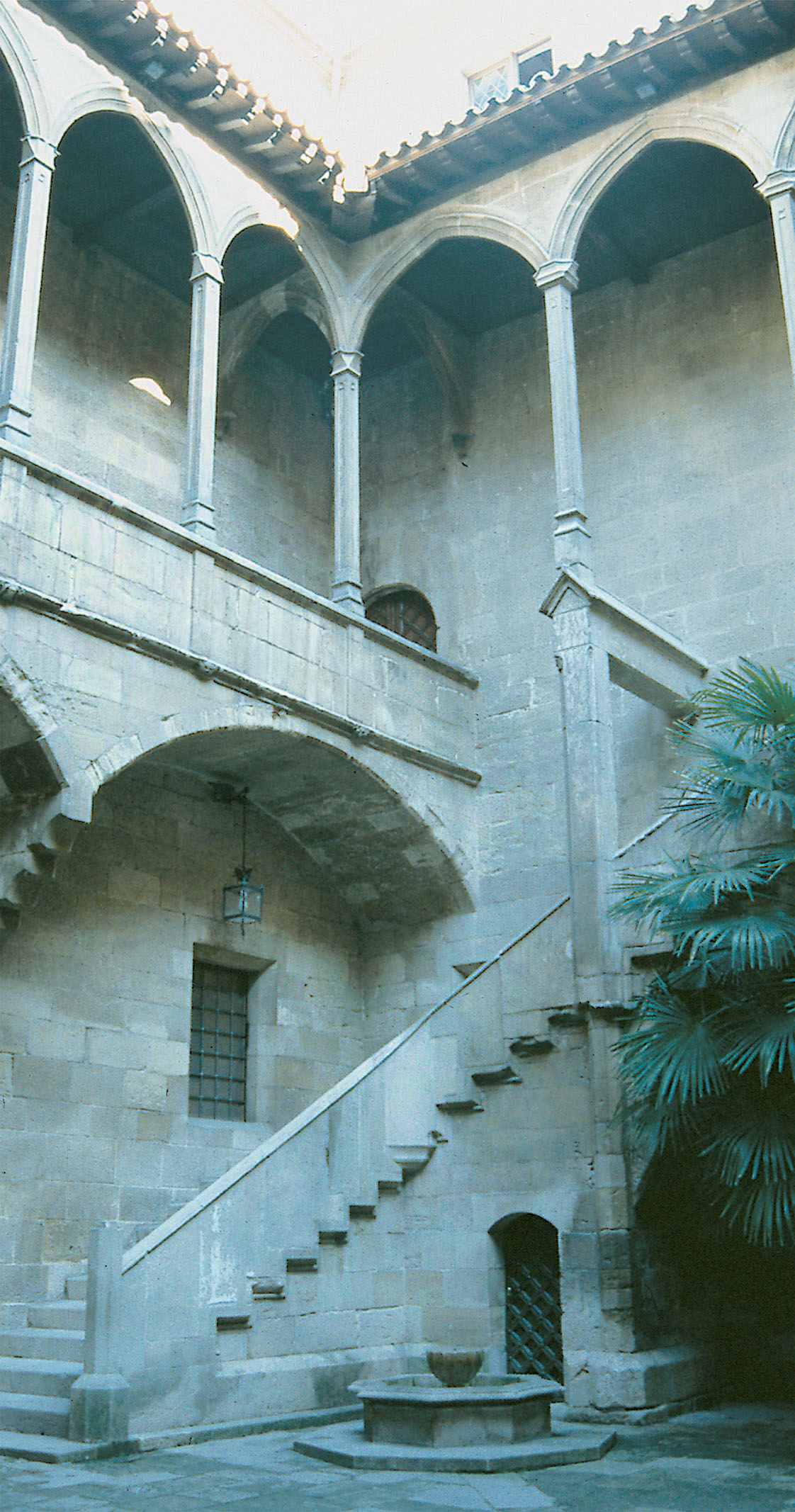
The inner court.

Institut d'Estudis Ilerdencs (Catalan pronunciation: [instiˈtud dəsˈtuðiz iləɾˈðɛŋs], from Ilerda, the ancient Roman name for the town; English: "Institute for Lleida Studies"), also known by the acronym IEI, is a cultural institution created on March 25, 1942 in Lleida, Catalonia, Spain by the provincial delegation, then under the leadership of Josep Maria de Porcioles, with the aim of promoting culture and research in the region of Lleida. This institution has been linked since its conception to the Spanish National Research Council. Since 1943 it has issued the magazine Ilerda.

== Overview ==
The medieval building that hosts the IEI, the former Hospital de Santa Maria on the Carrer Major in front of the Seu Nova, contains an archeological museum, a modern art museum (exhibiting most often the work of contemporary local artists), a documentation room, bibliography and pottery, a geological and paleontological collection and a library of books of Lleida, presented to the institution by R. Areny i Batlle, as well as different spaces for conferences and cultural activities. Since 1967 it runs the Cathedra of Catalan Culture Samuel Gili i Gaya. Its statutes were reformulated in 1986 in order to change the image of IEI and for a democratic turn to its organisation.

== See also ==
- Culture of Lleida
- Lleida Museum
- CaixaForum Lleida
