= Mariano Gomar de las Infantas =

Spanish lawyer and senator (1855–1923)

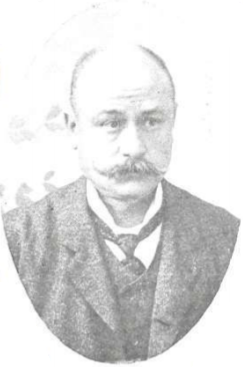

Senator of the Kingdom
- In office 1907–1910
- Constituency: Lleida

Personal details
- Born: 27 July 1855; Lleida, Spain
- Died: 25 February 1923 (aged 67); Lleida, Spain
- Political party: Integrist Party; Catalan Solidarity
- Occupation: Lawyer and politician

Mariano Gomar de las Infantas (27 July 1855 – 25 February 1923) was a Spanish lawyer and Integrist politician.

== Biography ==
Mariano Gomar de las Infantas descended from an important noble family of the city of Lleida. His parents were José de Gomar y Kessel and Eulalia de las Infantas March Millas. He studied Law and political sciences.

He fought in the Third Carlist War as an officer, siding with Carlos VII. He abandoned Carlist politics in 1888 to join the Integrist Party led by Ramón Nocedal. Earlier in 1886 Gomar de las Infantas had founded the journal Diario de Lérida with José Antonio Mostany, both of whom sided with the Integrists after the conflict and were expulsed from the Traditionalist Communion. He was later made director of the journal and held for years the title of provincial chief of the party in Lleida.

He was twice elected as deputy for the constituency of Seu d'Urgell in 1896 and 1901.

In 1907 he became a senator for the Catalan Solidarity coalition, which brought together most regionalist parties of the province. In October of the same year he led a campaign at the Ministry of Development to carry out public works at the Segre river near Lérida. He stood out as a regionalist senator and took part in many commissions to defend the interests of Catalonia.

Apart from politics, Gomar de las Infantas also worked extensively for the promotion of Eucharistic adoration in Spain, organizing many nocturne vigils and popularizing the Forty Hours' Devotion. He was also involved in cultural and artistic activities, and served as judge at the local painting contests of the B. Mariana Academy. He was also an active member of the Society of Saint Vincent de Paul. His obituary at journal La Cruz stated that Gomar had held many nobiliary titles, but hid them from the public as a matter of modesty.
