= Fountain of the Mermaid of Lleida =

Coordinates: 41.6139°N 0.630769°E

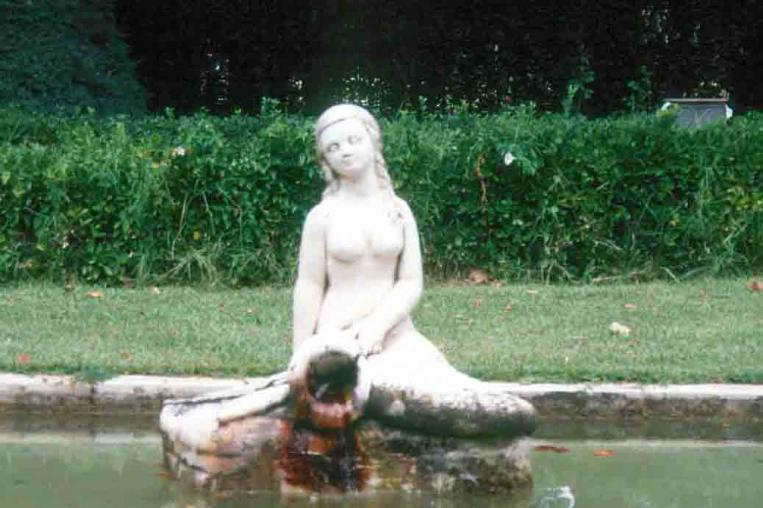
Fountain of the Mermaid.

The Fountain of the Mermaid of Lleida also known as "Font de la Sirena" is a fountain in the Parc des Champs Elysees in Lleida, Catalonia, Spain, which features a statue of a mermaid holding a conch out of which water flows. The fountain is surrounded by a garden.

The original deteriorating statue of a nymph was replaced by the mermaid in 1982. It is the city's second most-visited site, after the cathedral La Seu Vella.
