= Museu d'Art Jaume Morera =

Coordinates: 41°36′48.66″N 0°37′31.92″E

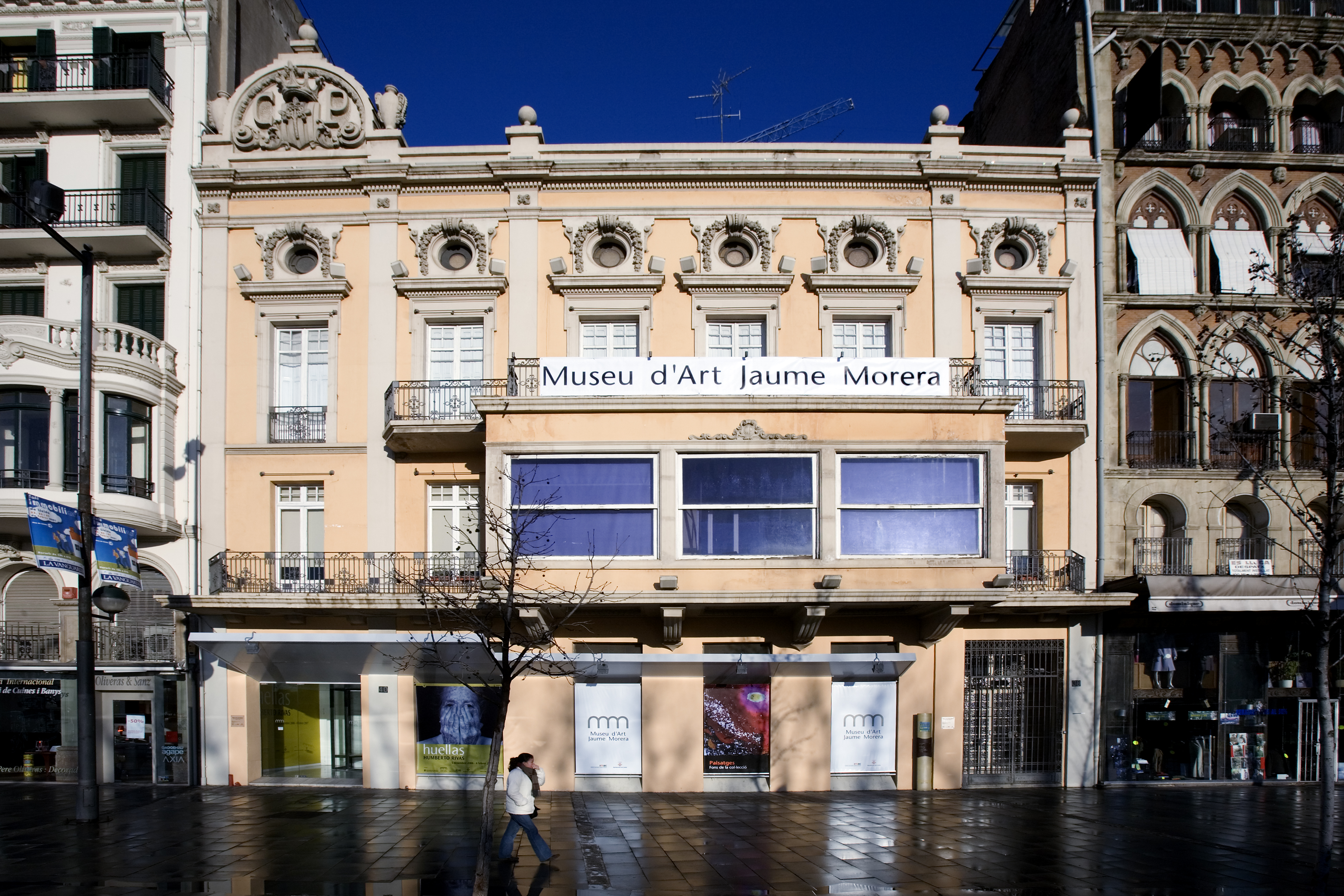
The city Casino, current venue of the museum

The Museu d'Art Jaume Morera (Jaume Morera Art Museum) is a museum in Lleida (Catalonia) created by the Diputació de Lleida and the Lleida City Council (La Paeria) with the collaboration of the painter Jaume Morera i Galícia. It is the museum of modern and contemporary art of the city of Lleida. Today is municipally owned and receives financial support from the Diputació de Lleida and the Department of Culture of the Generalitat of Catalonia. There is an entrance fee with the first Tuesday of the month being free.
