= New Cathedral of Lleida =

Cultural property in Lleida, Spain

- Cathedral of the Assumption
- Catalan: Seu Nova de Lleida; Spanish: Catedral Nueva de Lérida
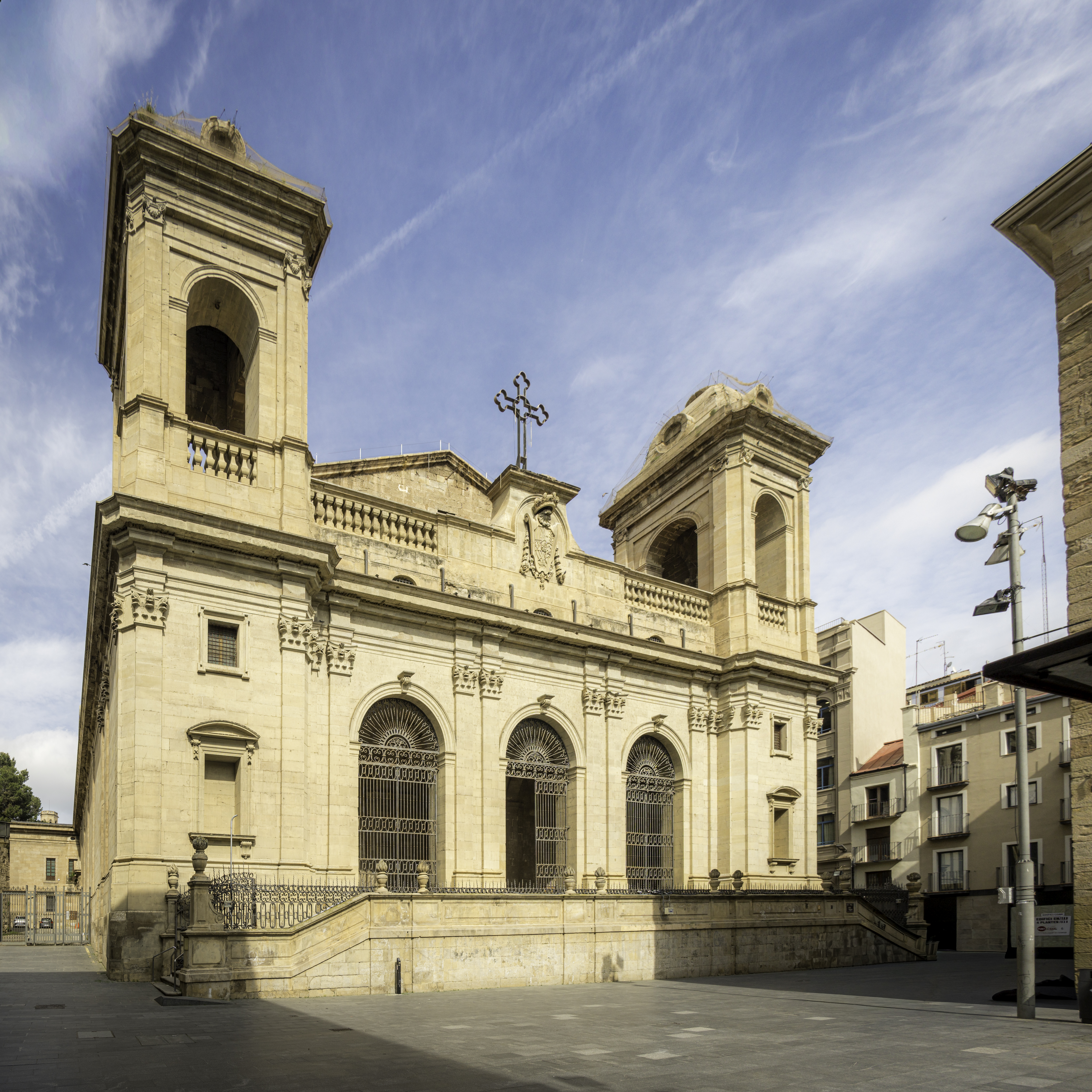
- Main façade in 2026
- New Cathedral of Lleida
- 41°36′47.94″N 0°37′22.65″E
- Location: Lleida
- Address: Plaça de la Catedral
- Country: Spain
- Denomination: Catholic

History
- Status: Cathedral
- Dedication: Assumption of Mary
- Dedicated: 28 May 1781

Architecture
- Architect: Pedro Martín-Paredes Cermeño
- Style: Baroque, Neoclassical
- Years built: 1761–1782

Administration
- Metropolis: Tarragona
- Diocese: Lleida

Clergy
- Bishop: Daniel Palau Valero

Spanish Cultural Heritage
- Type: Non-movable
- Criteria: Monument
- Designated: 9 June 1998
- Reference no.: RI-51-0010177

The Cathedral of the Assumption, commonly known as the New Cathedral of Lleida (Catalan: Seu Nova de Lleida, Spanish: Catedral Nueva de Lérida), is a Roman Catholic cathedral located in the city of Lleida, Catalonia, Spain. It is the seat of the Diocese of Lleida.

It was built between 1761 and 1782 with donations from Charles III of Spain, bishop Joaquín Sánchez, and other citizens of Lleida. The New Cathedral replaced the old cathedral, called La Seu Vella, which had been converted into a fortress and garrison as a result of the War of Spanish Succession.

Its style can be said to be austere Baroque or Neoclassical, and it is located by the main commercial street of the city, opposite the Santa Maria Hospital.

== History ==
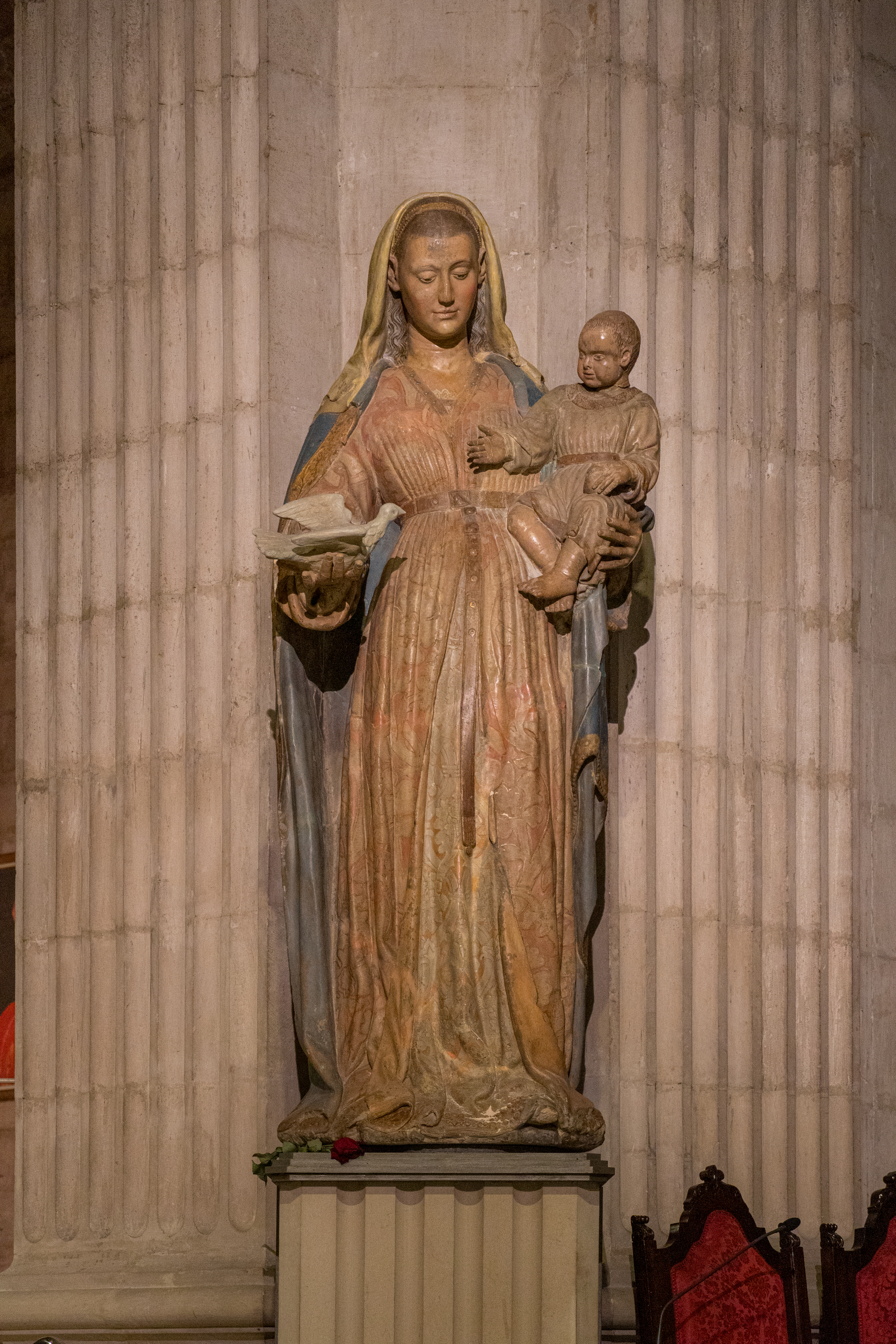
Mare de Déu del Blau. Gothic stone sculpture formerly located at the main entrance of the Seu Vella.

After the conversion of the former Medieval cathedral (now known as La Seu Vella) to a military garrison and fort in 1707, the cathedral was briefly transferred first to the Chapel of the Convent of the Company of Jesus and then to the Church of Sant Llorenç. Charles III of Spain gave permission and partially funded the construction of the new cathedral. The project by Pedro Martín-Paredes Cermeño was selected. Works were directed by Francisco Sabatini and Josep Prat i Delorta. Groundbreaking began on 15 April 1761, and it was dedicated on 28 May 1781. The austere building was built with local gray stone, but with a coat of arms of the ruling House of Bourbon. Shortly after, the cathedral suffered a first fire and had to be repainted and the windows replaced.

On 13 May 1808, during the Peninsular War, the cathedral was sacked and burnt. It suffered arson on 25 August 1936. It was restored between 1940 and 1955 under the direction of Francisco Clavera Armentero. It was reopened to the public on 28 September 1955.

== Architecture ==
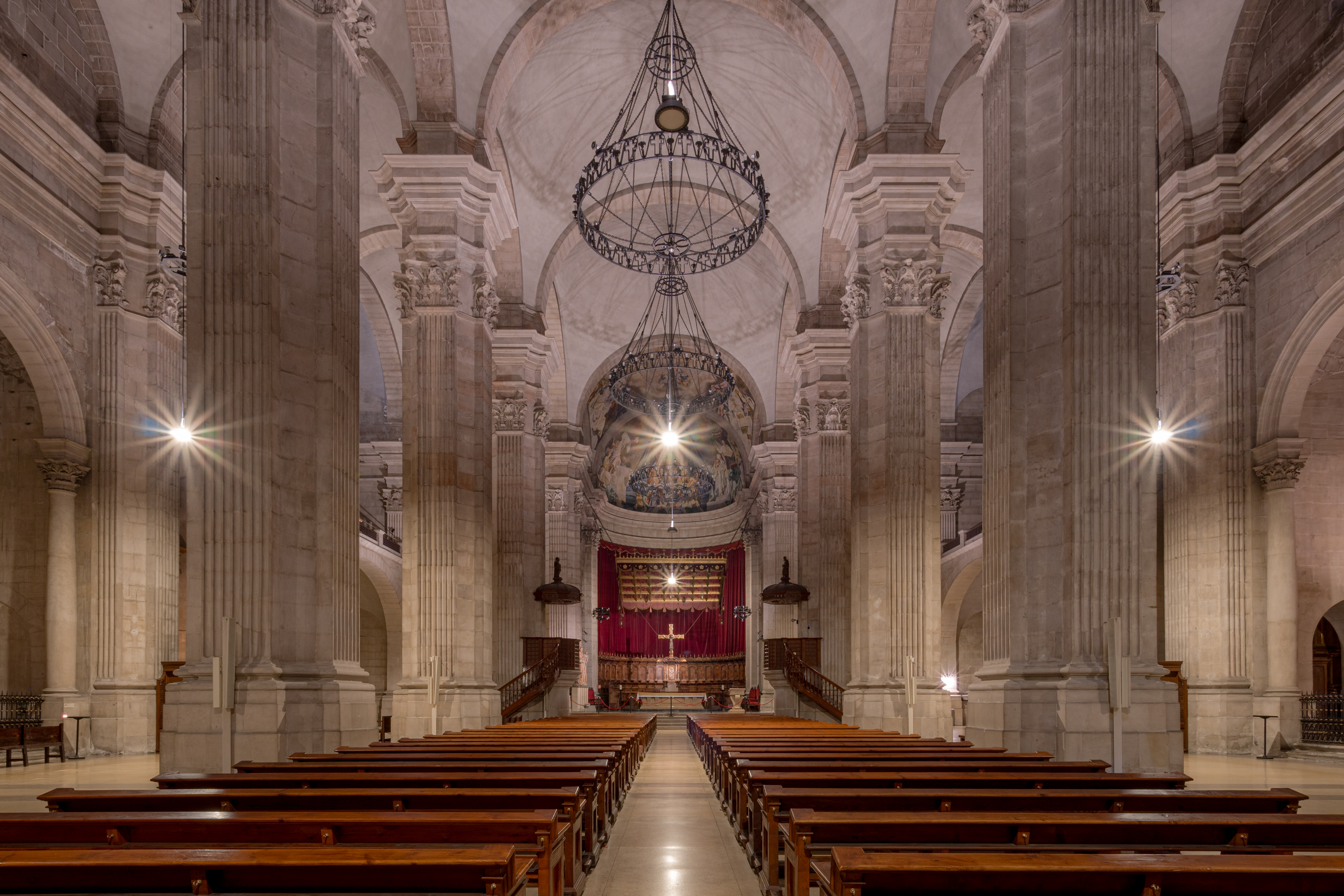
Interior overview

The cathedral is considered the earliest example of the Neoclassical style in Catalonia, incorporating as well elements of late Baroque and French academicist styles.

The cathedral follows a hall church layout, featuring three naves of equal height, an ambulatory around the apse, and chapels situated within the buttresses of the aisles and the head of the church. The facade is flanked by two quadrangular towers, and the entrance is preceded by an atrium with three large archways featuring wrought-iron gates and a grand double-access lateral staircase, topped by a profusely decorated balustrade.

== Gallery ==
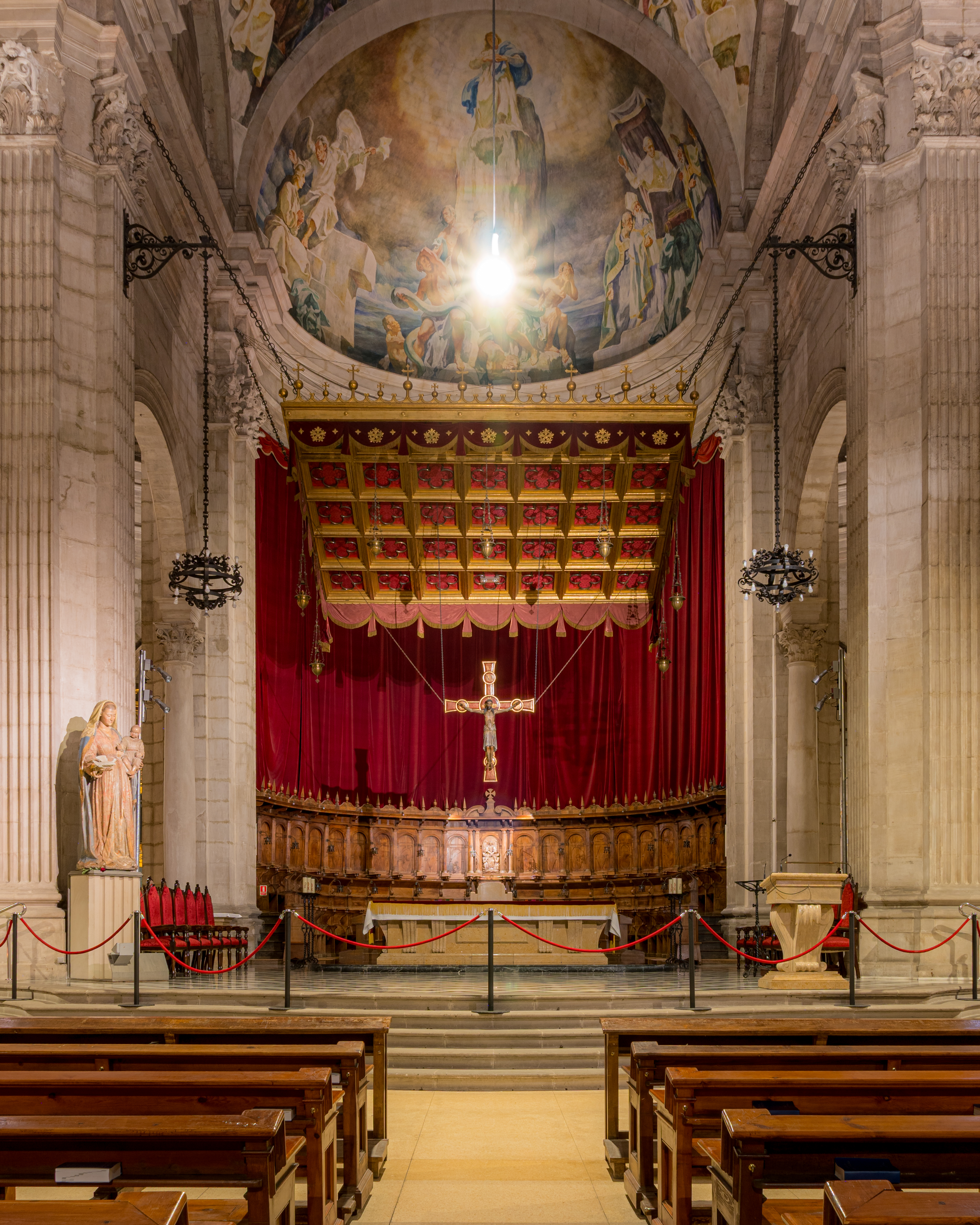
Altar

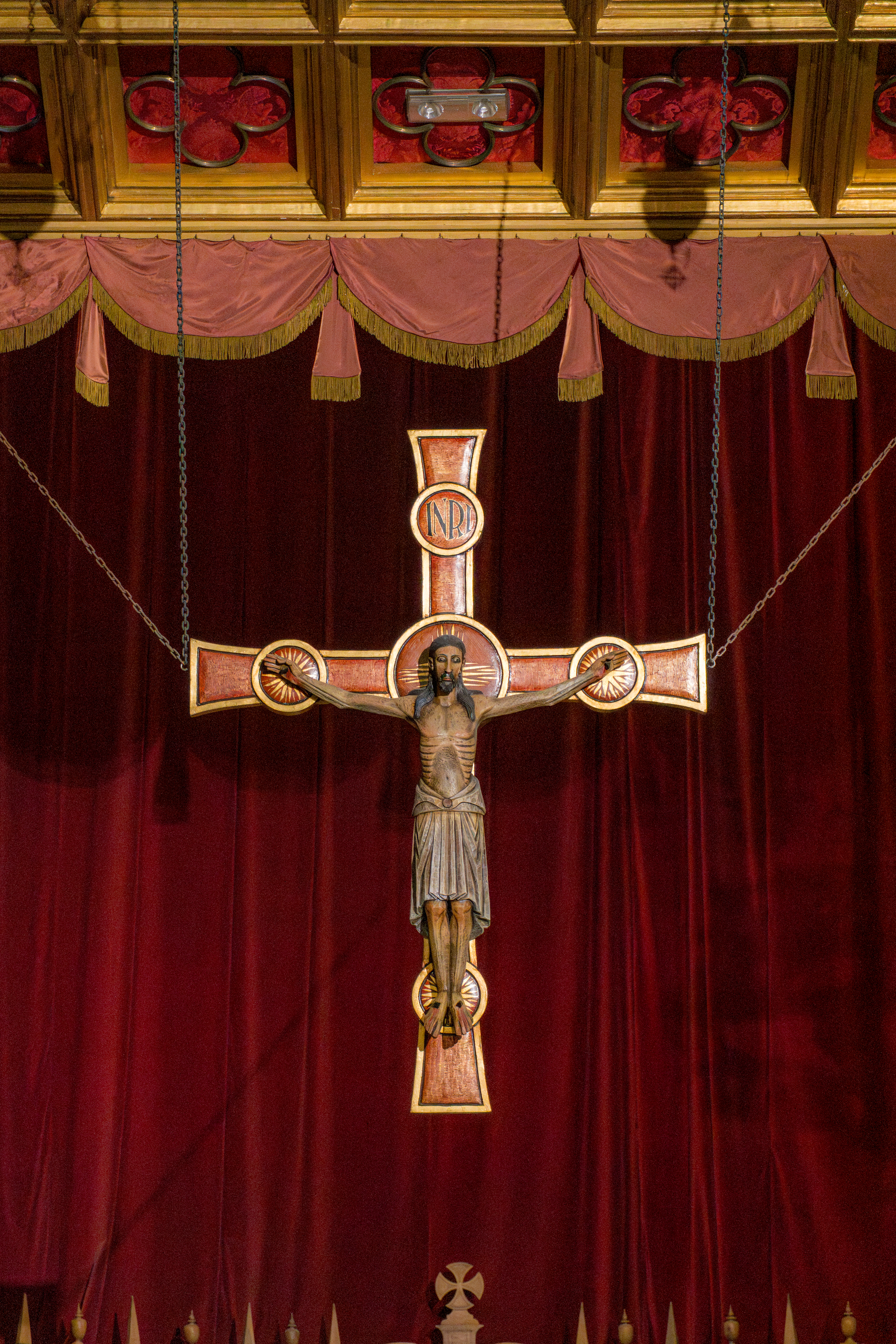
Cross

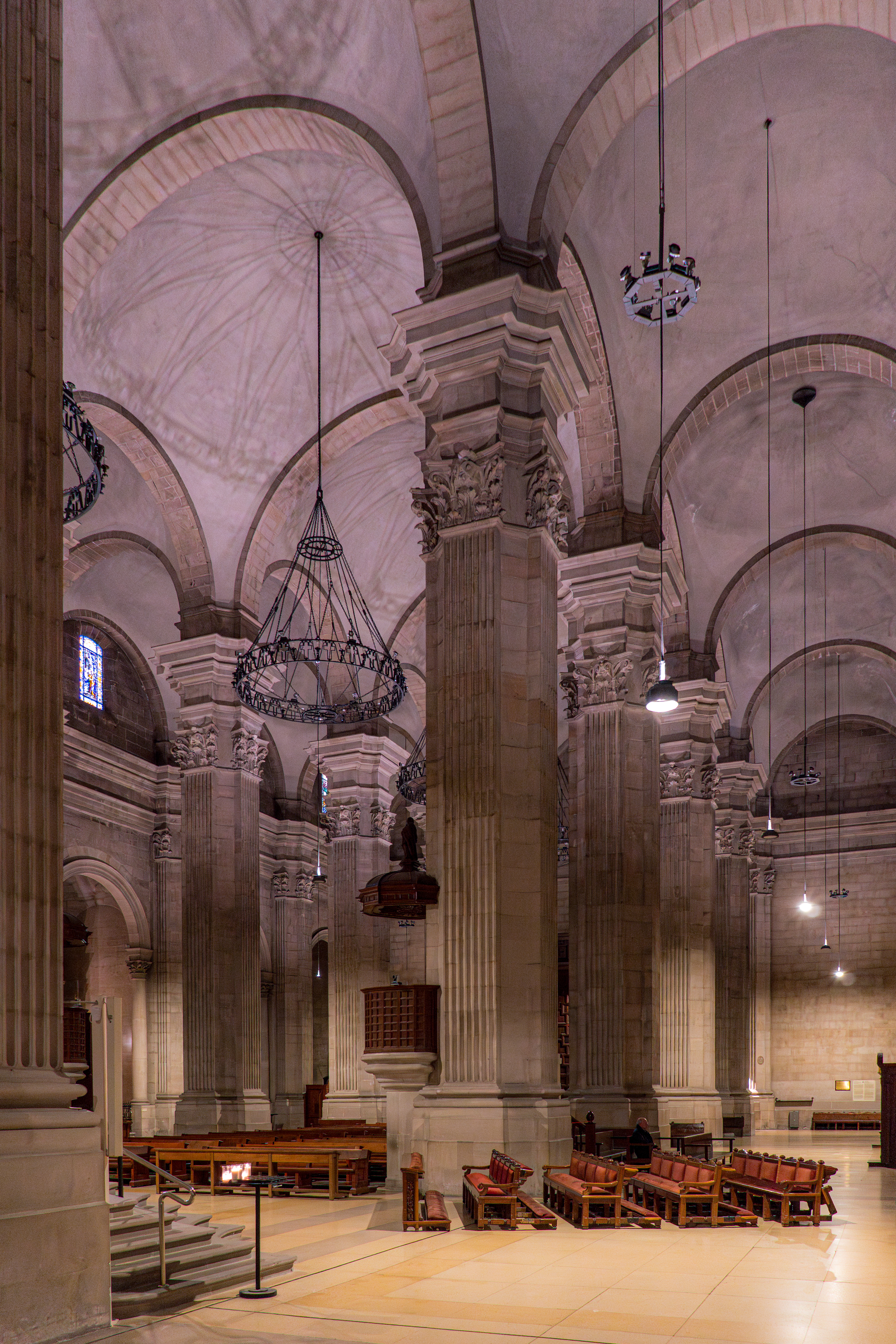
Naves

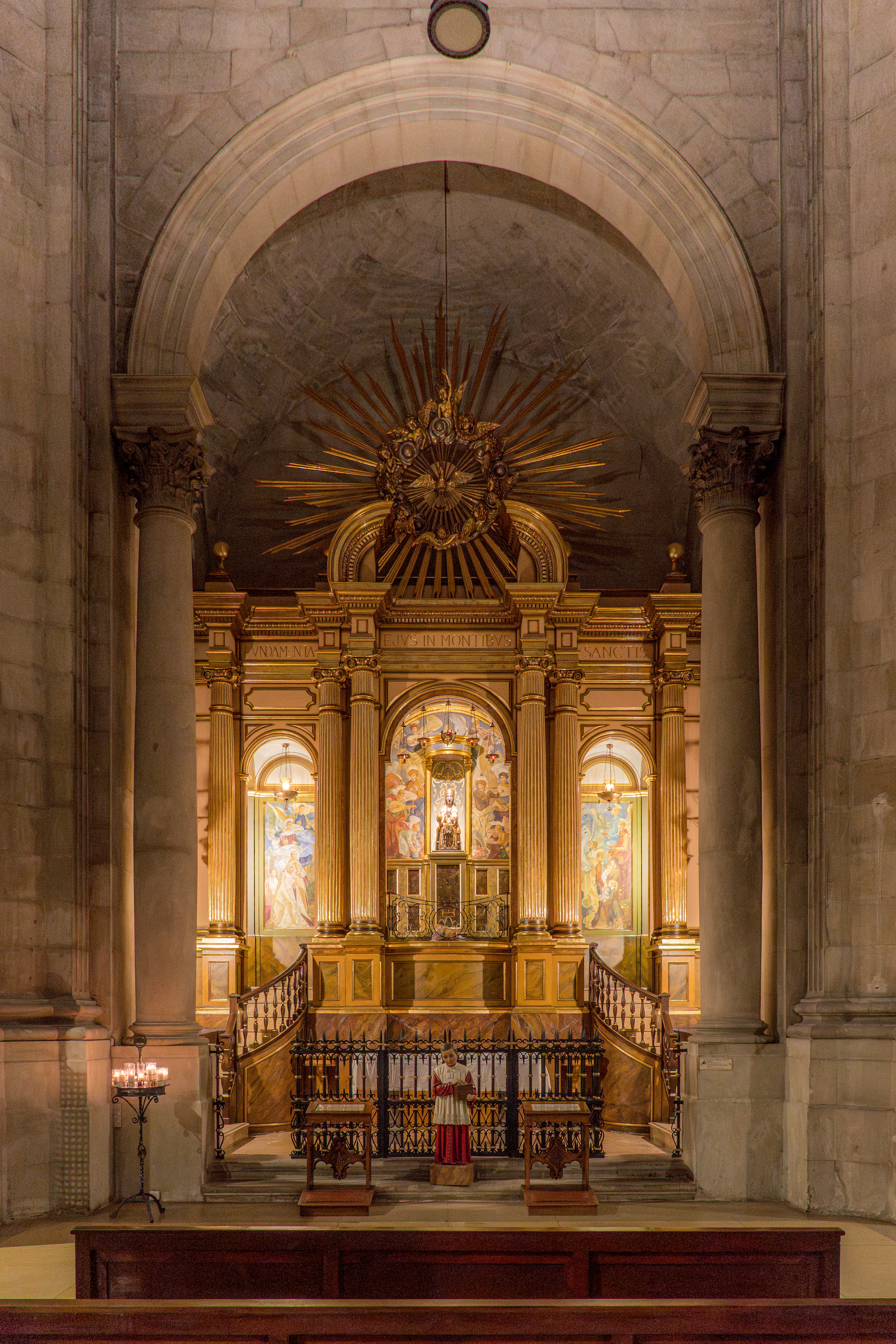
Chapel our Lady of Montserrat

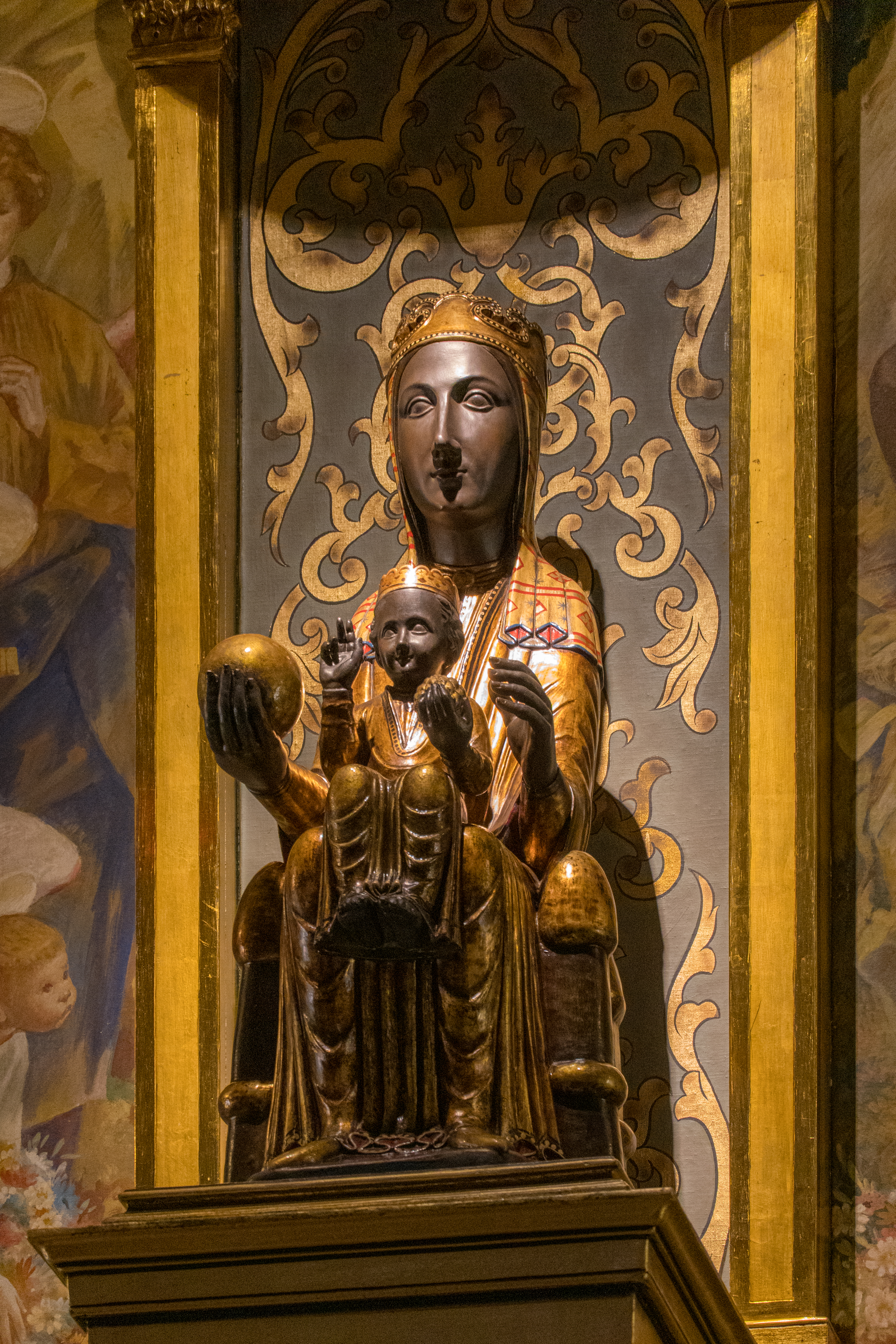
Our Lady of Montserrat, patron saint of Catalonia

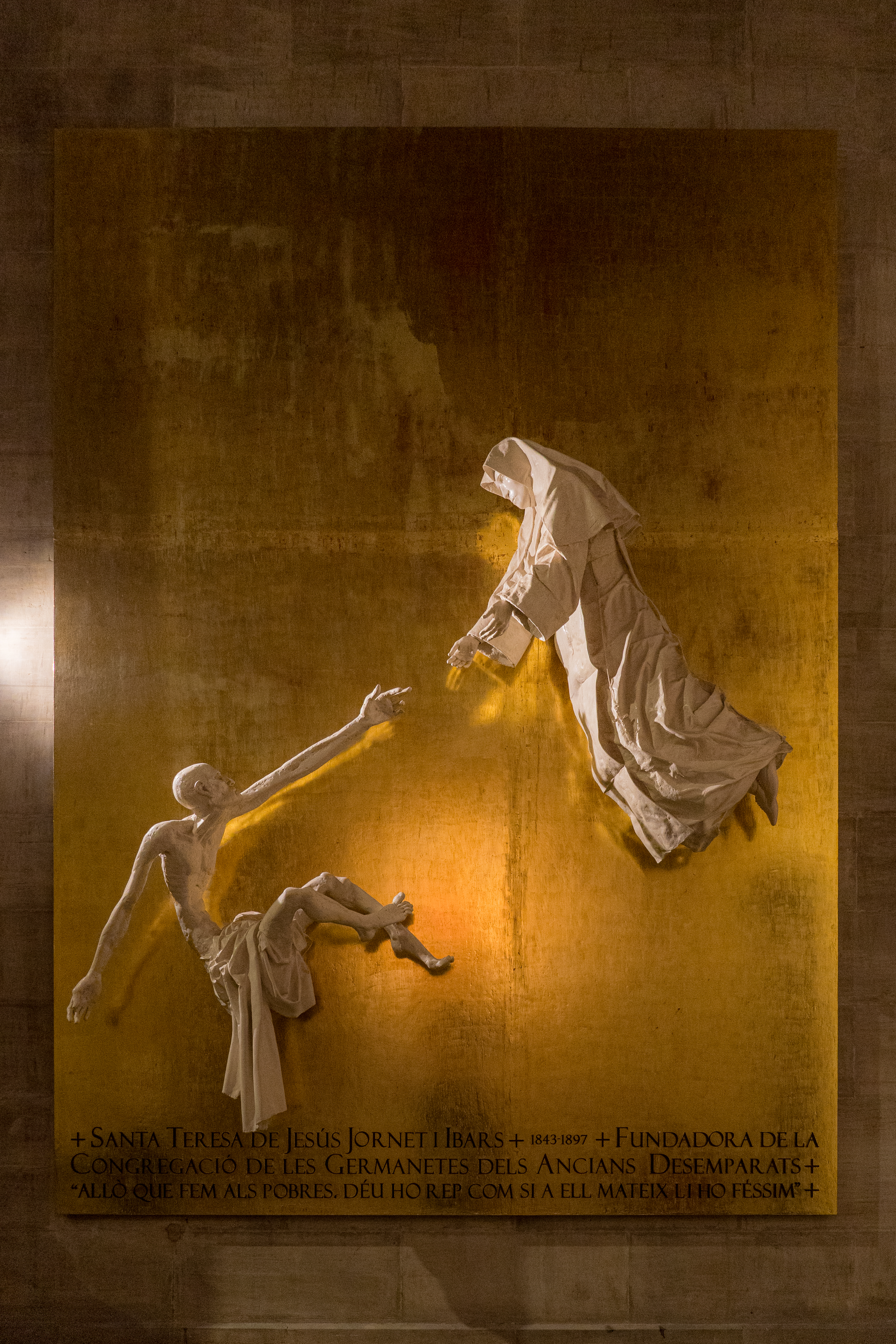
Group of Teresa de Jesús Jornet i Ibars, 2014

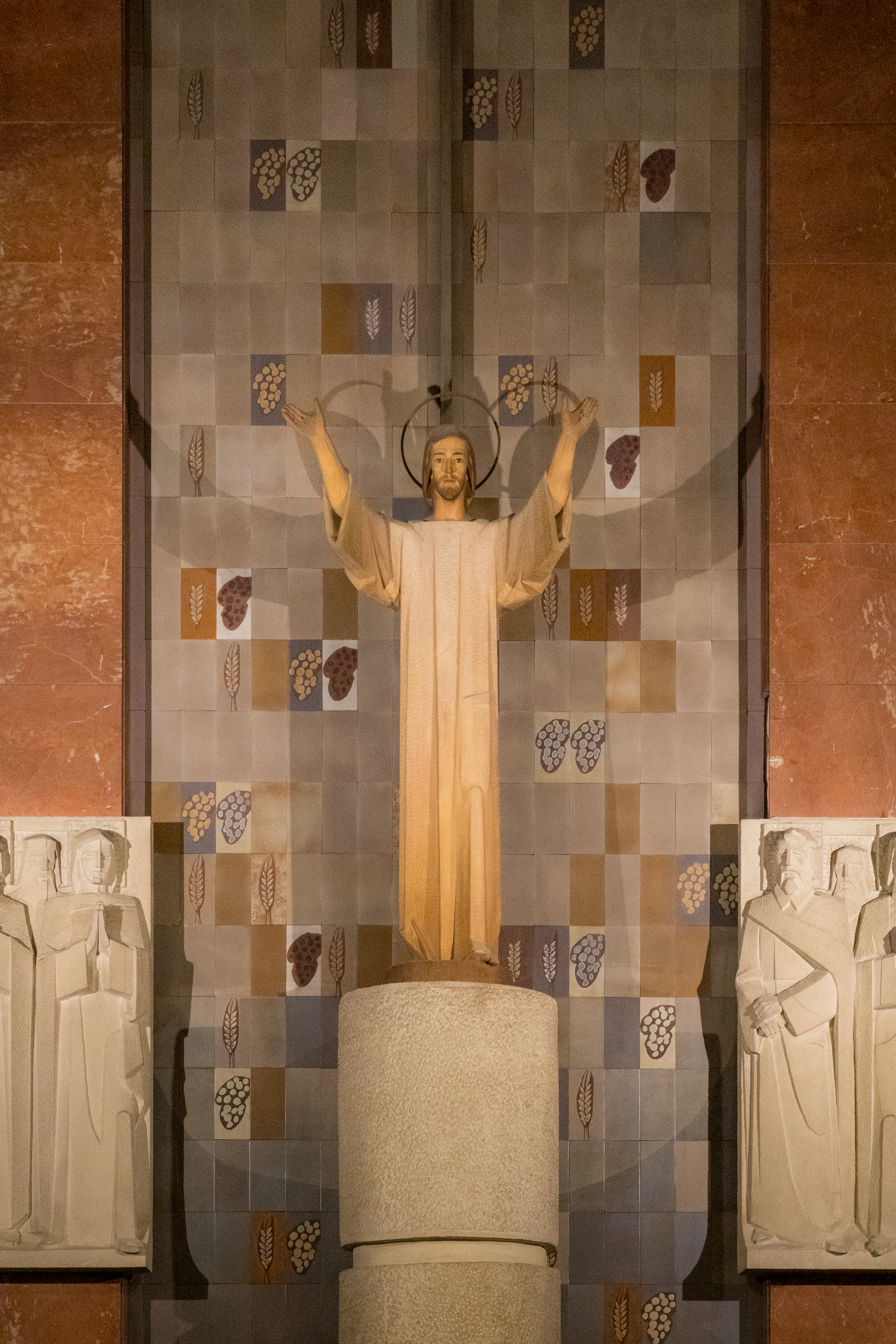
Sacred Heart of Jesus

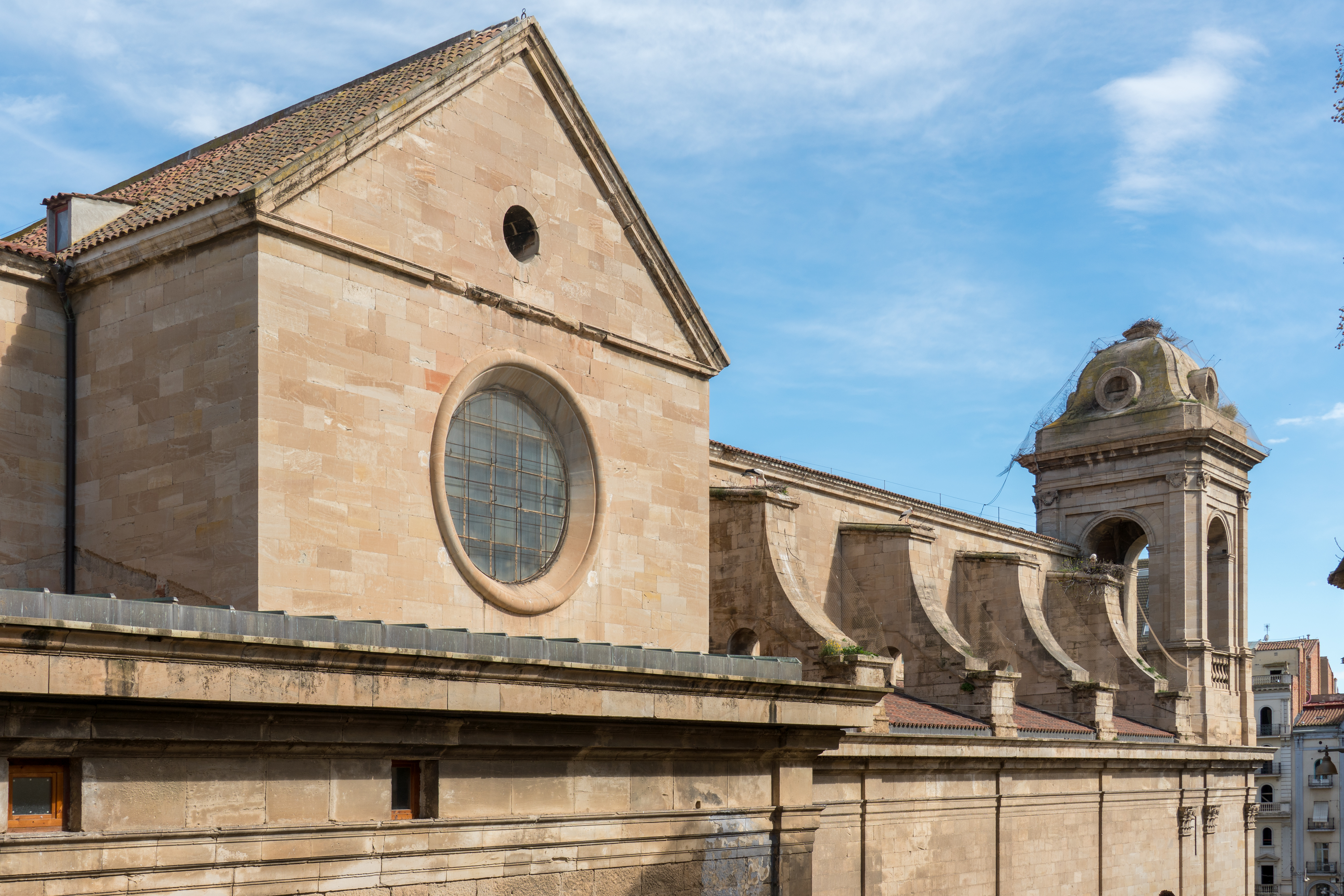
Exterior and tower

== See also ==
- List of bishops of Lleida
