= Balàfia =

Coordinates: 41°37′40″N 0°37′25″E

Balàfia is a barrio (neighborhood/division of a municipality) of Lleida, Catalonia, Spain. As of 2008 it had a population of 13,151 people. It is the most populous district in the city of Lleida.

== Location ==
The neighborhood is located to the west of the city and is bounded to the east by the Pardinyes district, from the starting point of Moncada in the west, to the south of the old railroad route and north through the neighborhood of Secà de Sant Pere.

The neighborhood has excellent transportation. It may be reached via the Plaça Europa, Baró de Maials Avenue and the Corregidor Escofet boulevard and from out of town on the N-230 for the C-12.

== Facilities ==
Balàfia is noted for its very modern complex and it has large open areas including, most notably, the Magnolies Square, which is the largest square in Lérida. In addition there are the Balàfia and the Maria Rubies Square. In terms of educational facilities, it has a Bressol municipal school, two high schools and a third under construction and two secondary education centers. Landmarks include the Balàfia Civic Centre headquarters.

== Transportation ==
Access to the neighbour via buses from Lleida can be done via Line 8 (Balàlafia / Gualda) and Line 7 (Secà de Sant Pere) and these are very close to Line 2 (Ronda) and Line 10 (Exterior) since these stop at Europa Square.
