= Church of Sant Llorenç, Lleida =

Coordinates: 41°36′51.85″N 0°37′17.69″E

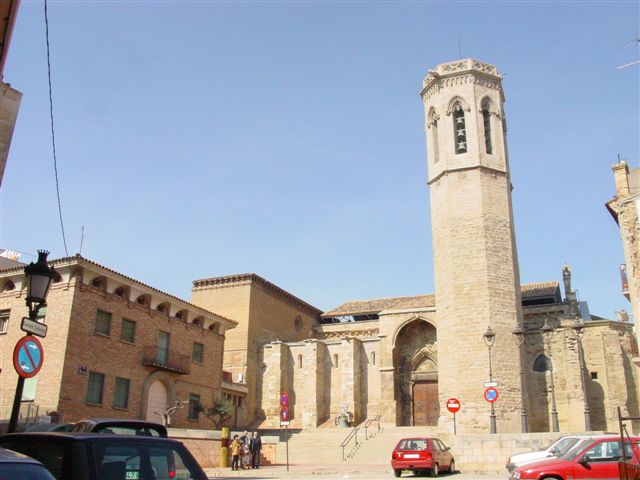
Sant Llorenç.

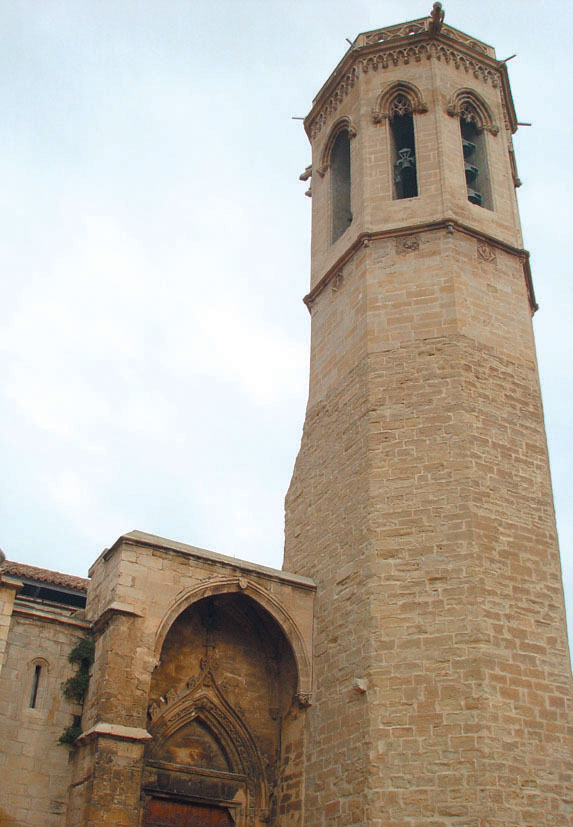
The bell tower.

Sant Llorenç (Saint Lawrence) is a Romanesque church in Lleida (Catalonia, Spain) dating from the late 12th century, with Gothic additions from the 15th century. The initial architects of the church were Pere de Coma, the master of works who in charge of La Seu Vella, the old cathedral of Lleida. It has a nave and two aisles, built with the same height, and three apses; the nave is in the Romanesque style, whereas the aisles are Gothic, as is the octagonal bell tower. In 2002 part of the church was refurbished.

== Works of art ==
It contains four imposing altarpieces: Saint Lawrence, Saint Ursula (attributed to Jaume Cascalls), Saint Peter and Saint Lucy. One of the two entrances, on Plaça de Sant Josep, can be seen the family crest of Berenguer de Gallart. The church has been Lleida's episcopal see twice during its existence. Among the works of art inside Sant Llorenç there are a Gothic painting of Santa Maria de la Candelera by Mateu Ferrer and the sculpture of the Mare de Déu dels Fillols, originally located in the Seu Vella.
