= Lleida =

Lleida Lérida
- City and municipality
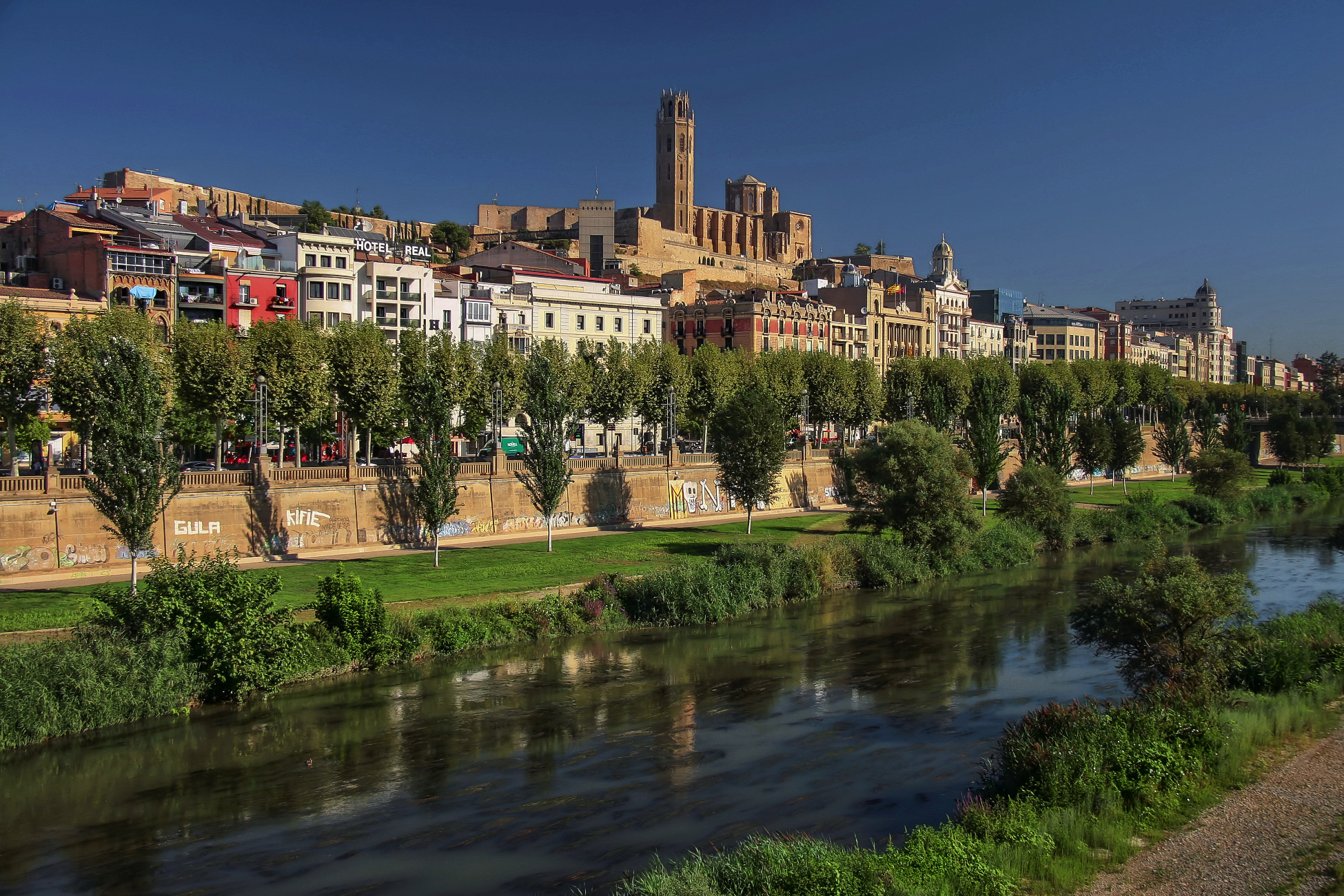
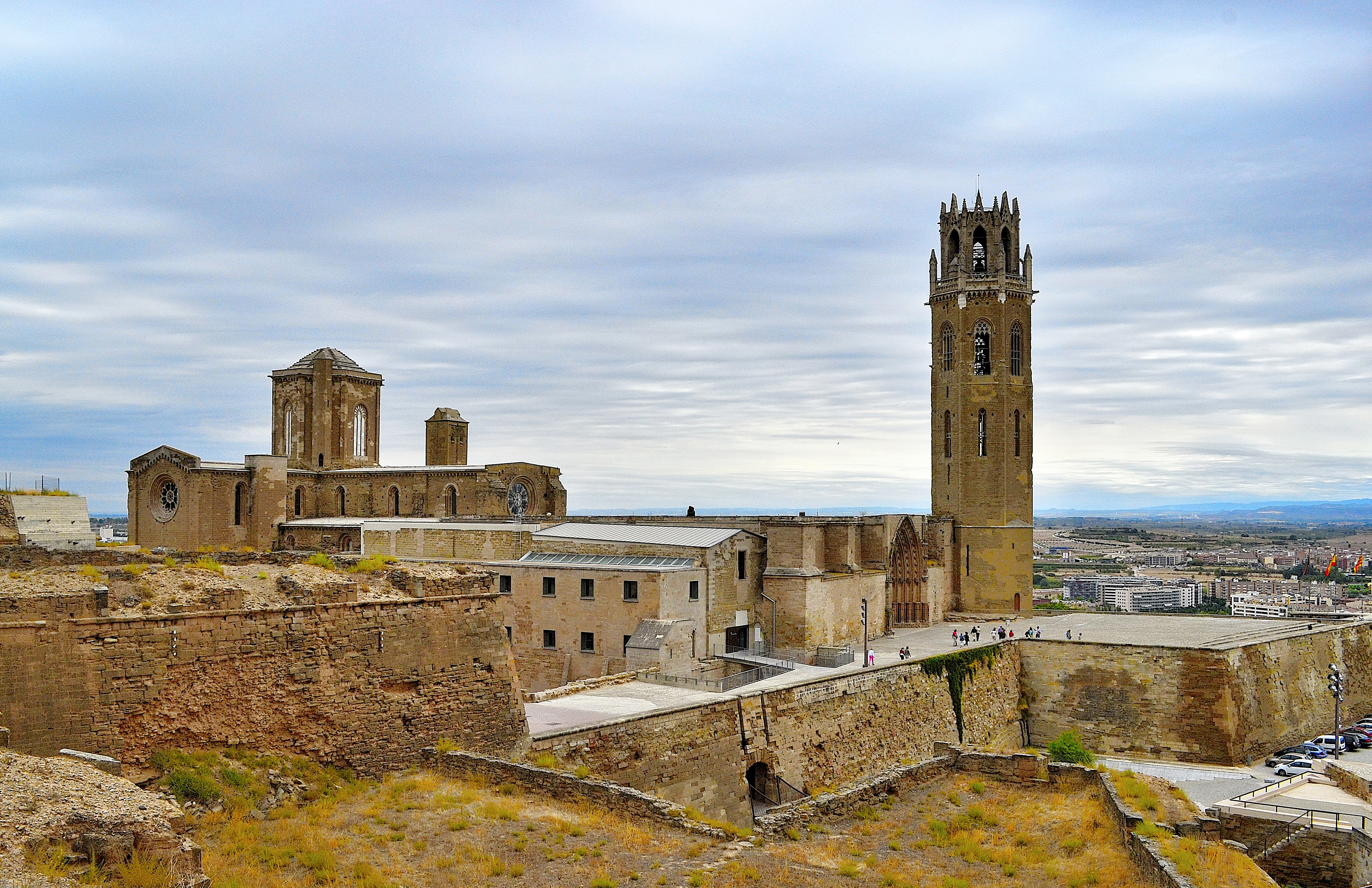
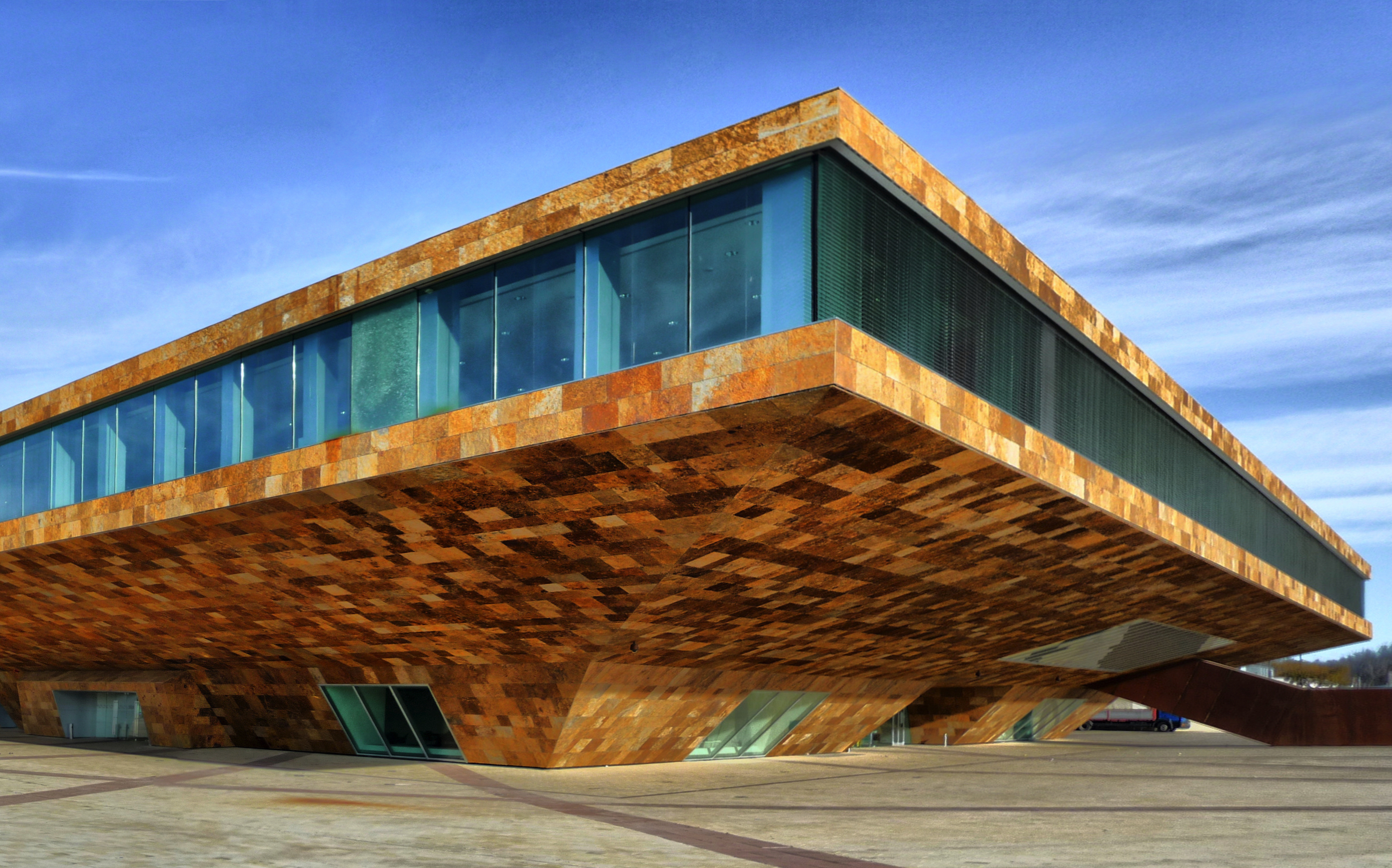
- Lleida over the Segre river La Seu Vella La Llotja

- Flag Coat of arms

- Location in Segrià county
- Interactive map of Lleida
- Location within Catalonia Location within Spain
- Coordinates: 41°37′00″N 00°38′00″E
- Sovereign state: Spain
- Community: Catalonia
- Region: Ponent
- County: Segrià
- Province: Lleida
- Founded: 6th century BC

Government
  - Type: Mayor-Council
  - Mayor: Fèlix Larrosa i Piqué (2023) (PSC)

Area
  - Total: 212.3 km^{2} (82.0 sq mi)
- Elevation: 155 m (509 ft)

Population (2022)
  - Total: 140,797
  - Density: 663.2/km^{2} (1,718/sq mi)
- Time zone: UTC+1 (CET)
  - Summer (DST): UTC+2 (CEST)
- Postal code: 25001-25007
- Dialing code: 34 (Spain) + 973 (Lleida)
- Official language(s): Catalan, Spanish
- Climate: BSk
- Website: paeria.cat

Lleida, (Note: Pronunciation of Lleida: Standard Catalan: [ˈʎejðə], Western Catalan: [ˈʎejða], locally [ˈʎejðɛ] Spanish: [ˈʎejða], also [ˈɟʝejða] (with yeísmo) - See name) also known in Spanish as Lérida, (Note: Pronunciation of Lérida (unofficial): Spanish: [ˈleɾiða] - See name) is a city in the west of Catalonia, Spain. It is the capital and largest town in Segrià county, the Ponent region and the province of Lleida. Geographically, it is located in the Catalan Central Depression. It had 140,797 inhabitants as of 2022.

Lleida is one of the oldest towns in Catalonia, with recorded settlements dating back to the Bronze Age period. Until the Roman conquest of the Iberian Peninsula, the area served as a settlement for an Iberian people, the Ilergetes. The town became a municipality, named Ilerda, under the reign of Augustus. It was ruled by Muslims from the 8th century until reconquered in 1149. In 1297, the University of Lleida was founded, becoming the third oldest in the Iberian Peninsula. During the following centuries, the town was damaged by several wars such as the Reapers' War in the 17th century and the Spanish Civil War in the 20th century. Since then, the city has been in constant urban, commercial and demographic growth.

== Name ==
Although the usual Spanish form of the town's name is Lérida, pronounced [ˈleɾiða], the associations of that name with enforced Castilianization under the Francoist regime have led to the Catalan form Lleida being used for official purposes even in Spanish. The local pronunciation of the name is [ˈʎejðɛ], while the pronunciation in Western Catalan is [ˈʎejða] and in Standard Central Catalan is [ˈʎejðə].

== History ==
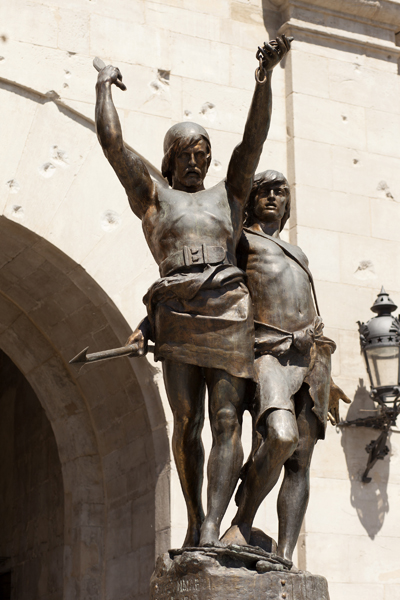
Indíbilis, king of the Ilergetes (left) and Mandonius, king of the Ausetani (right)

In ancient times the city, named Iltrida and Ilerda, was the chief city of the Ilergetes, an Iberian tribe. Indíbil, king of the Ilergetes, and Mandoni, king of the Ausetanes, defended it against the Carthaginian and Roman invasions.

Under the Romans the city was incorporated into the Roman province of Hispania Tarraconensis, and was a place of considerable importance, historically as well as geographically. It stood upon an eminence, on the right (west) bank of the river Sicoris (the modern Segre), the principal tributary of the Ebro, and some distance above its confluence with the Cinga (modern Cinca); thus commanding the country between those rivers, as well as the great road from Tarraco (modern Tarragona), the provincial capital, to the northwest of Spain, which here crossed the Sicoris.

Its situation induced the legates of Pompey in Spain to make it the key of their defense against Caesar, in the first year of the Civil War (49 BC). Afranius and Marcus Petreius threw themselves into the place with five legions; and their siege by Caesar himself (Battle of Ilerda), as narrated in his own words, forms one of the most interesting passages of military history. Caesar's skill as a general, in a contest where the formation of the district and a series of natural events seemed very favorable to his enemies, ultimately gained him victory. It was ended by the capitulation of Afranius and Petreius. In consequence of the battle, the Latin phrase Ilerdam videas is said to have been used by people who wanted to cast bad luck on someone else.

Under the Roman Empire Ilerda was a prosperous city and a municipium. It minted its own coins. It had a fine stone bridge over the Sicoris, which was so sturdy that its foundations support a bridge to this day. In the time of Ausonius the city had fallen into decay but it rose again into importance in the Middle Ages.

It was part of Visigothic and Muslim Hispania until it was conquered from the Moors by Count Ramon Berenguer IV of Barcelona in 1149.

It was the seat of a major university, the oldest in the Crown of Aragon, until 1717, when it was moved by Philip V to the nearby town of Cervera. The modern University of Lleida has been active since 1991.

During the Reapers' War Lleida was occupied by the French and rebel forces. In 1644 the city was conquered by the Spanish under Felipe da Silva.

Lleida served as a key defence point for Barcelona during the Spanish Civil War and fell to the Insurgents, whose air forces bombed it extensively in 1937 and 1938. The 2 November 1937 Condor Legion attacks against Lleida became especially infamous since they targeted the school known as Liceu Escolar de Lleida. 48 children and several teachers died in it that day, 300 people were killed in the 2 November bombings altogether and the town would be bombed and besieged again in 1938, when it was conquered by Francisco Franco's forces.

After decades without population growth, the city experienced a large influx of Andalusians. Nowadays it is home to immigrants of 146 different nationalities.

Lleida was the Capital of Catalan Culture in 2007.

=== Jewish History ===
The mikveh, or Jewish ritual bath, in Lleida.

The Juderia, or Jewish quarter in Lleida dates back to the 11th century. The Jewish quarter in Lleida was also referred to as La Cuirassa. This name distinction is unique compared to other Jewish communities in Spain, and historians believe that the origin of the term is linked to the former Jewish quarter that existed in the times of the Moors, which was connected to the "coiraça", a protrusion of the city wall. The Jews established their quarter next to this wall, leading to the name "La Cuirassa." A street named "Judería", which still exists in today's Lleida dates back to the time where the Jewish quarter was still active. The Jewish quarter was located in the fortified area of Lleida; in this area, a ring with the name "Goig" carved in Hebrew was found in 1870. A Jewish ritual bath, or mikveh dating to the 9th century, one of the oldest in Europe, was found in Lleida.

== Climate ==
Lleida has a temperate semi-arid climate (Köppen BSk). Winters are mild and foggy though cooler than places on the coast while summers are hot and dry. Frosts are common during winter although snowfall can occasionally fall, averaging 1 or 2 days. Precipitation is low, with an annual average of 369 millimetres (15 in) with a peak in April and May and another peak in September and October.

Climate data for Lleida (1981–2010)
Month	Jan	Feb	Mar	Apr	May	Jun	Jul	Aug	Sep	Oct	Nov	Dec	Year
Record high °C (°F)	23.5 (74.3)	23.4 (74.1)	28.5 (83.3)	33.0 (91.4)	35.0 (95.0)	43.4 (110.1)	43.1 (109.6)	40.8 (105.4)	37.2 (99.0)	32.5 (90.5)	26.0 (78.8)	20.6 (69.1)	43.4 (110.1)
Mean daily maximum °C (°F)	10.0 (50.0)	13.8 (56.8)	18.3 (64.9)	20.7 (69.3)	25.0 (77.0)	29.8 (85.6)	33.0 (91.4)	32.4 (90.3)	27.8 (82.0)	22.0 (71.6)	14.9 (58.8)	9.8 (49.6)	21.5 (70.7)
Daily mean °C (°F)	5.5 (41.9)	7.7 (45.9)	11.3 (52.3)	13.7 (56.7)	17.9 (64.2)	22.3 (72.1)	25.2 (77.4)	24.9 (76.8)	20.9 (69.6)	15.9 (60.6)	9.7 (49.5)	5.7 (42.3)	15.0 (59.0)
Mean daily minimum °C (°F)	0.9 (33.6)	1.6 (34.9)	4.2 (39.6)	6.7 (44.1)	10.8 (51.4)	14.7 (58.5)	17.4 (63.3)	17.4 (63.3)	13.9 (57.0)	9.7 (49.5)	4.4 (39.9)	1.5 (34.7)	8.6 (47.5)
Record low °C (°F)	−14.2 (6.4)	−7.6 (18.3)	−7.0 (19.4)	−2.2 (28.0)	0.5 (32.9)	6.0 (42.8)	9.5 (49.1)	7.1 (44.8)	3.7 (38.7)	−1.5 (29.3)	−7.5 (18.5)	−9.5 (14.9)	−14.2 (6.4)
Average precipitation mm (inches)	26 (1.0)	15 (0.6)	21 (0.8)	39 (1.5)	42 (1.7)	27 (1.1)	12 (0.5)	18 (0.7)	41 (1.6)	43 (1.7)	30 (1.2)	24 (0.9)	342 (13.5)
Average precipitation days (≥ 1.0 mm)	4.2	2.6	3.5	5.4	5.5	3.5	1.8	2.4	3.8	4.8	4.4	4.1	46
Average snowy days	0.6	0.2	0.2	0	0	0	0	0	0	0	0	0.2	1.2
Average relative humidity (%)	81	71	62	59	58	53	52	56	63	73	80	84	66
Mean monthly sunshine hours	116	162	226	248	282	321	356	319	256	195	135	96	2,712
Source 1: Agencia Estatal de Meteorologia
Source 2: Periodico El Pais

== Districts and neighbourhoods ==
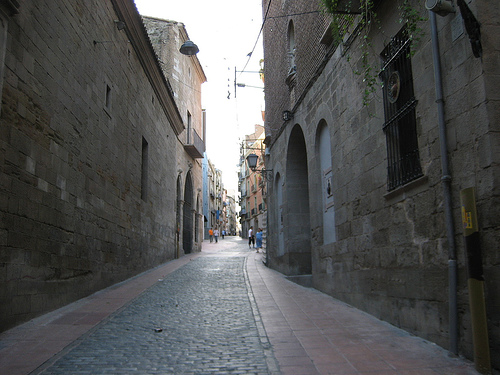
Cavallers Street in Centre Històric.

Lleida is divided in the following districts by the Socioeconomic Observatory of Lleida:

- Balàfia
- Les Basses d'Alpicat
- La Bordeta
- Butsènit
- Camp d'Esports
- Cappont
- Centre Històric
- Ciutat Jardí
- Humbert Torres
- Instituts-Templers
- Joc de la Bola
- Llívia
- Magraners
- Mariola
- Pardinyes
- Príncep de Viana-Clot
- Rambla Ferran-Estació
- Secà de Sant Pere
- Torres de Sanuí
- Universitat

== Transport ==
=== Railway ===
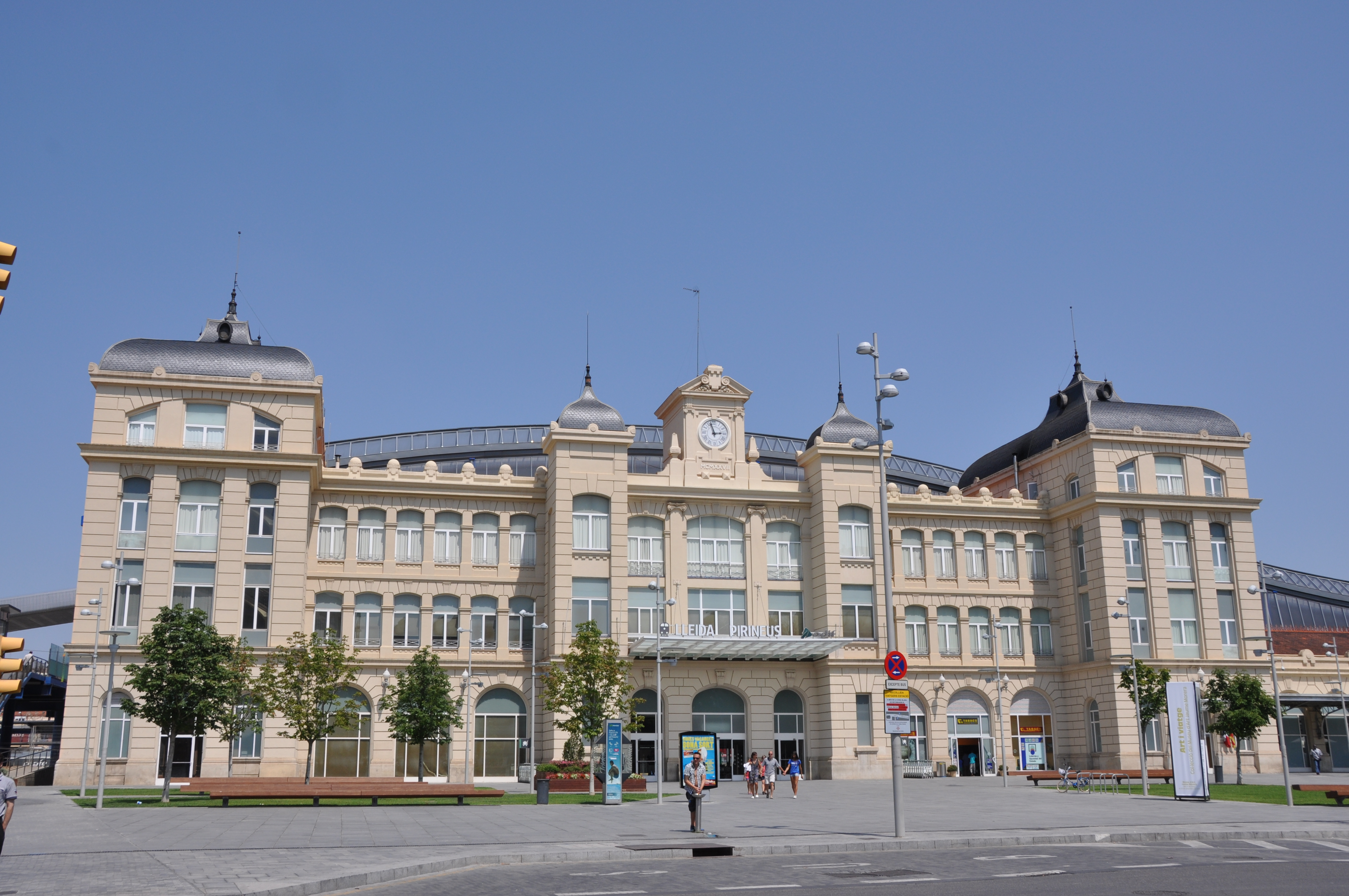
Lleida Pirineus railway station

Lleida is served by Renfe's Madrid–Barcelona high-speed rail line, serving Barcelona, Zaragoza, Calatayud, Guadalajara, and Madrid. The new airport opened in January 2010, and a minor airfield is located in Alfès. The town is the western terminus of the Eix Transversal Lleida-Girona, and a railway covering the same distance (Eix Transversal Ferroviari) is being planned.

Lleida's only passenger railway station is Lleida Pirineus. It is served by both Renfe and Ferrocarrils de la Generalitat de Catalunya train lines. In the future a Rodalies Lleida commuter network will connect the town with its adjacent area and the main towns of its province, improving the existing network with more train frequency and new infrastructure. A second railway station Pla de la Vilanoveta in an industrial area is only used by freight trains. A future railway museum will be located in its facilities. Since 2008 the bulk of public transport of Lleida's surrounding area, mainly buses operated by several companies, is managed by Autoritat Territorial de la Mobilitat de l'Àrea de Lleida.

=== Bus ===
The urban buses, coloured yellow with blue stripes and owned by Autobusos de Lleida, include the following lines:

- L-1 Interior
- L-2 Ronda
- L-3 Pardinyes
- L-4 Mariola – Parc científic i tecnològic
- L-5 Bordeta
- L-6 Magraners
- L-7 Secà
- L-8 Balàfia-Gualda
- L-9 Hospitals
- L-10 Exterior
- L-11 Llívia-Caparrella
- L-11B Llívia-Caparrella-Butsenit
- L-12 C.Històric-Universitat
- L-13 Cappont
- L-14 Agrònoms
- L-P Polígons
- L-17 Bordeta-Ciutat Jardí
- L-18 Palau de Congressos- Rambla de la Mercé
- L-19 Butsenit
- L-N Wonder (Regular night service)
- L-Bus Turístic (tourist bus)
- L-Aeroport
- L-Llotja

In addition to these, there's a tourist bus and a regular night service to nearby clubs.

=== Airport ===
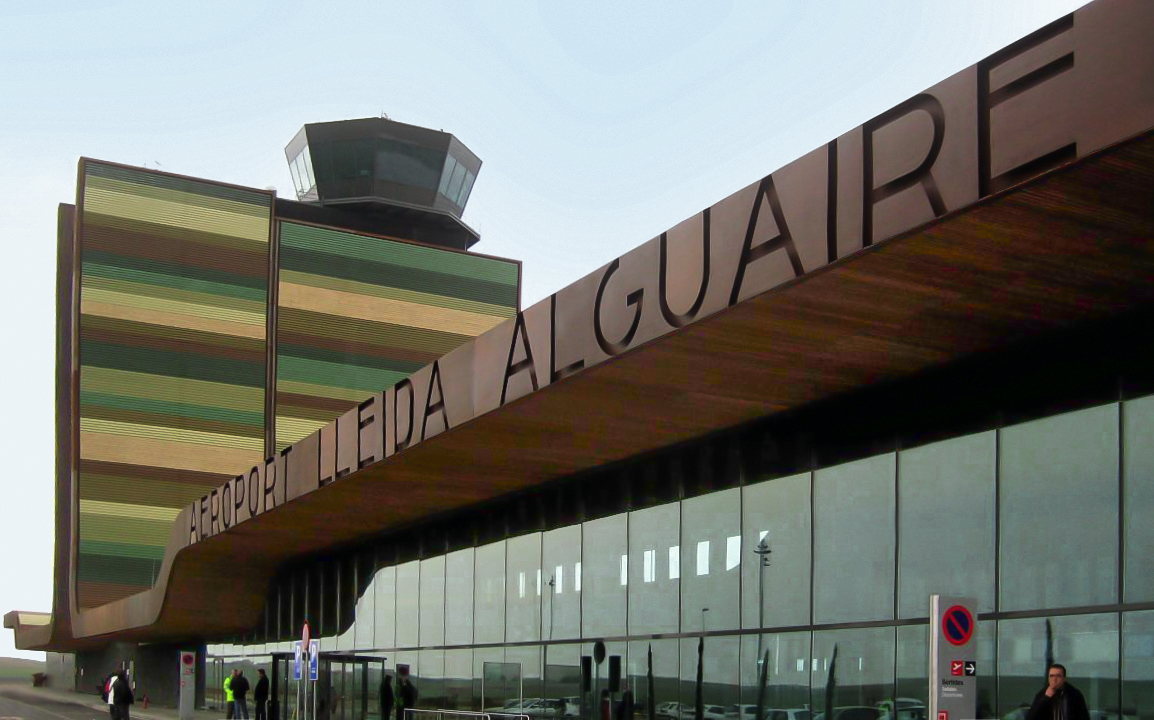
Lleida-Alguaire airport

Lleida is served by Lleida-Alguaire airport which opened in 2010. The airport provides direct routes to the Balearic Islands which are operated by Iberia. The nearest major airport is Josep Tarradellas Barcelona–El Prat Airport which provides most domestic and international destinations, it is located 154 km (96 mi) south east of Lleida.

=== Future and planned services ===
A tram-train system is pending approval. Using an existing but outdated passenger line, it would link Balaguer and Lleida, crossing both towns in a much needed move towards better public transportation, both inner-city and between localities.

== Languages ==
Lleida is a traditionally Catalan-speaking city, with a characteristic dialect (known as Western or, more specifically, Northwestern Catalan, or colloquially lleidatà). Most of the population is actively bilingual in Spanish.

Largest groups of foreign residents
Nationality	Population (2025)
Morocco	7,062
Romania	4,458
Colombia	2,946
Senegal	2,016
Algeria	1,888

== Culture ==
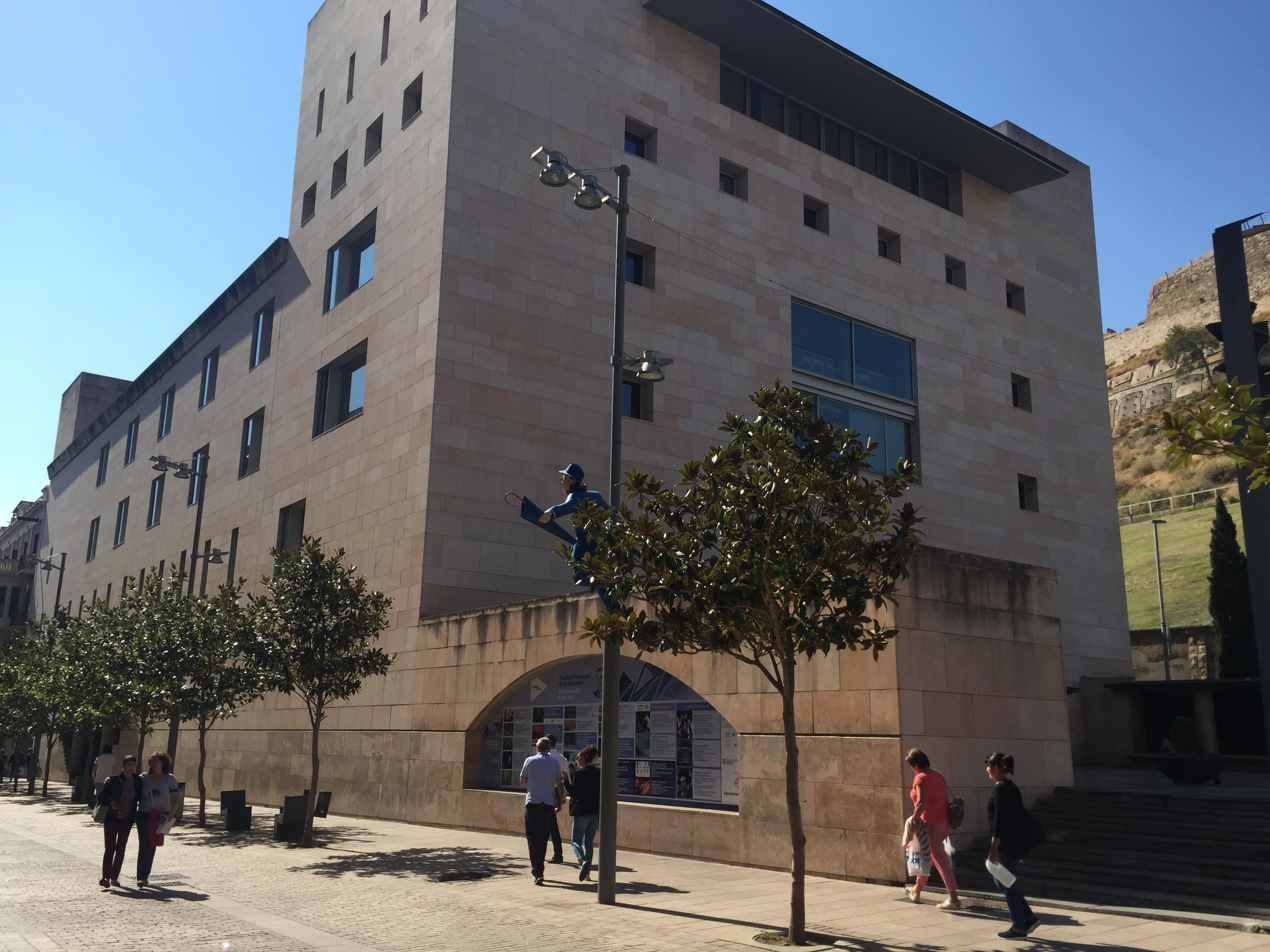
Auditori Enric Granados

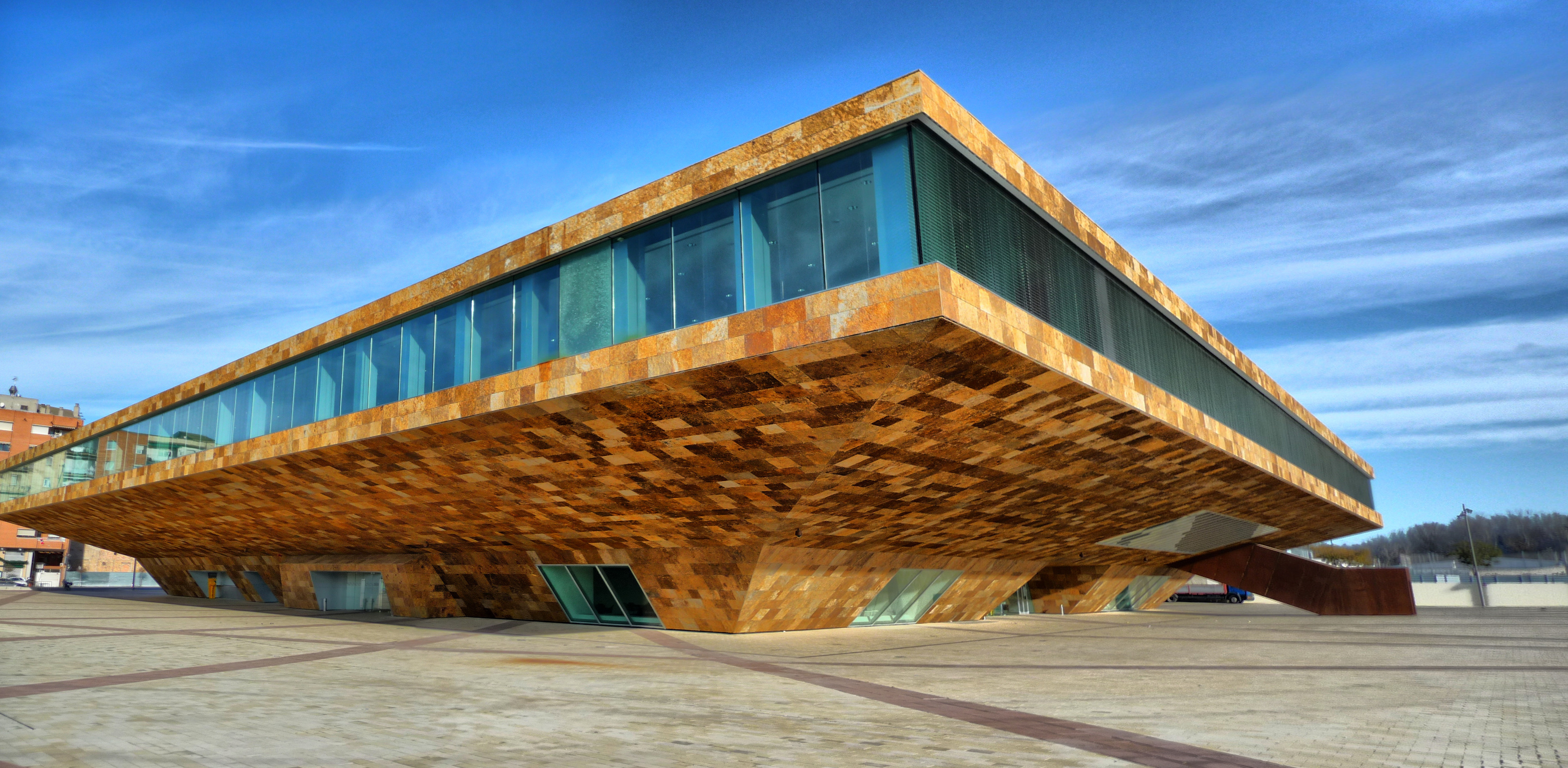
La Llotja de Lleida

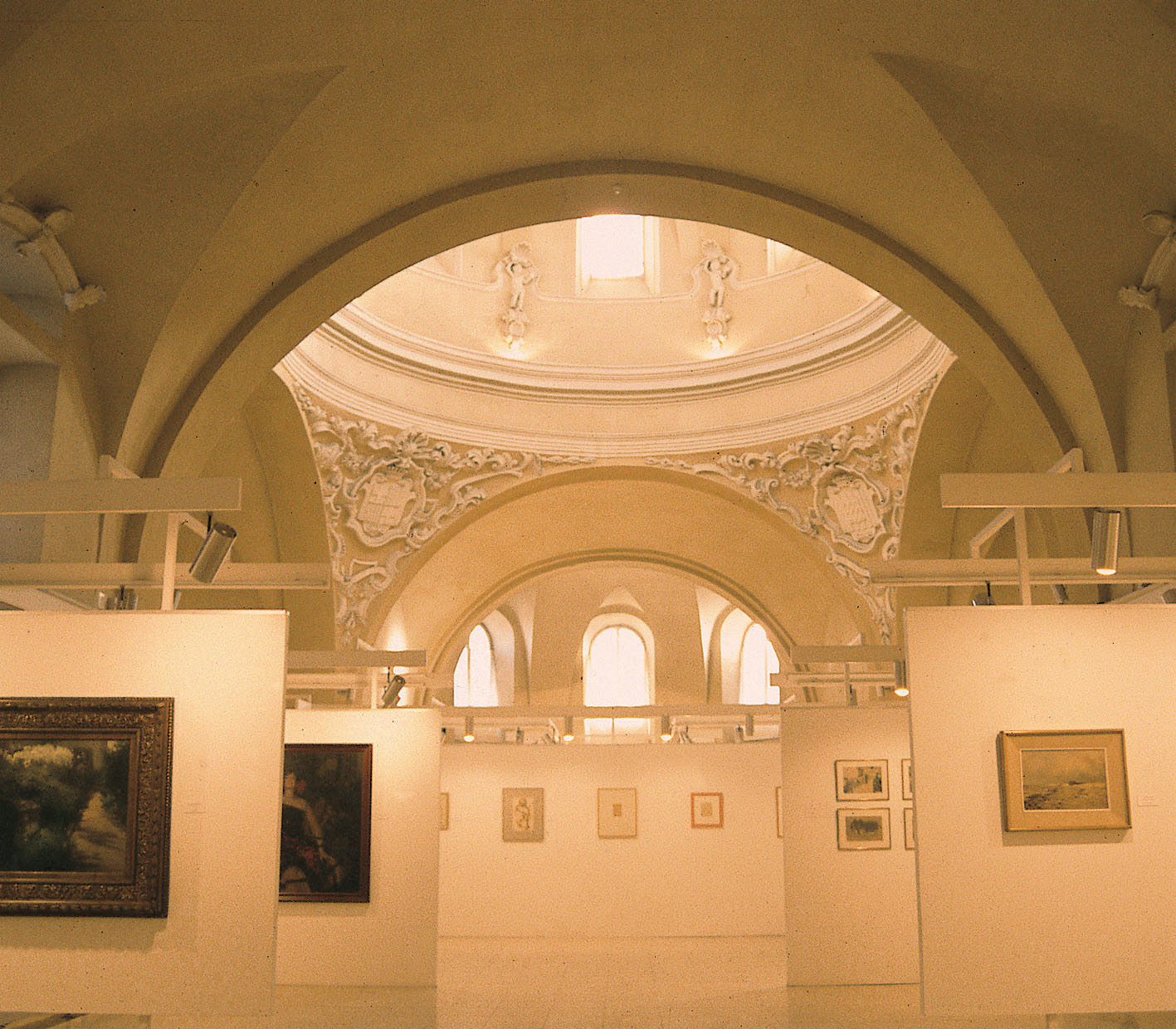
Museu d'Art Jaume Morera

Lleida was the Capital of Catalan Culture in 2007.

=== Theatre and music venues ===
Enric Granados Auditorium is the city's concert hall and main music institution and conservatory. It is named after the composer Enric Granados, who was born in the city. CaixaForum Lleida (formerly known as Centre Cultural de la Fundació La Caixa) includes a concert hall. Teatre Municipal de l'Escorxador is the town's main theatre; it includes a concert venue, Cafè del Teatre. A theatre and congress centre, La Llotja de Lleida, opened in 2010.

=== Music festivals ===
There are two important music festivals in Lleida; MÚSIQUES DISPERSES Folk Festival in March, and the jazz festival JAZZ TARDOR in November. Concerts are also a regular fixture of the two local feasts, Sant Anastasi in May, and Sant Miquel in September.

=== Film ===
CaixaForum Lleida is the usual venue for film-related events and screenings. A Latin-American film festival is held yearly in the town (Mostra de Cinema Llatinoamericà de Lleida), and an animation film festival called Animac is held every May.

=== Art and museums ===
The Lleida Museum opened in 2008 and displays historical artefacts and works of art from various periods. The Institut d'Estudis Ilerdencs, a historically relevant building, exhibits both ancient and contemporary art. The Centre d'Art La Panera is a contemporary art institution. The Museu d'Art Jaume Morera displays art from the 20th and 21st centuries (as well as artwork by its namesake).

The city has a number of small municipal galleries, such as the Sala Municipal d'Exposicions de Sant Joan and the Sala Manel Garcia Sarramona. There are also several institutions dedicated to local artists, such as the Sala Leandre Cristòfol, containing artwork by the sculptor and painter Leandre Cristòfol (1908–1998); and the Sala Coma Estadella, dedicated to the sculptor and painter Albert Coma Estadella (1933–1991).

Private art galleries include the Espai Cavallers. The private foundation CaixaForum Lleida and the Public Library of Lleida also offer regular exhibits. The now defunct Petite Galerie was an innovative and influential gallery in the 1970s.

The Escola Municipal de Belles Arts provides higher education in the arts.

=== Traditional culture ===
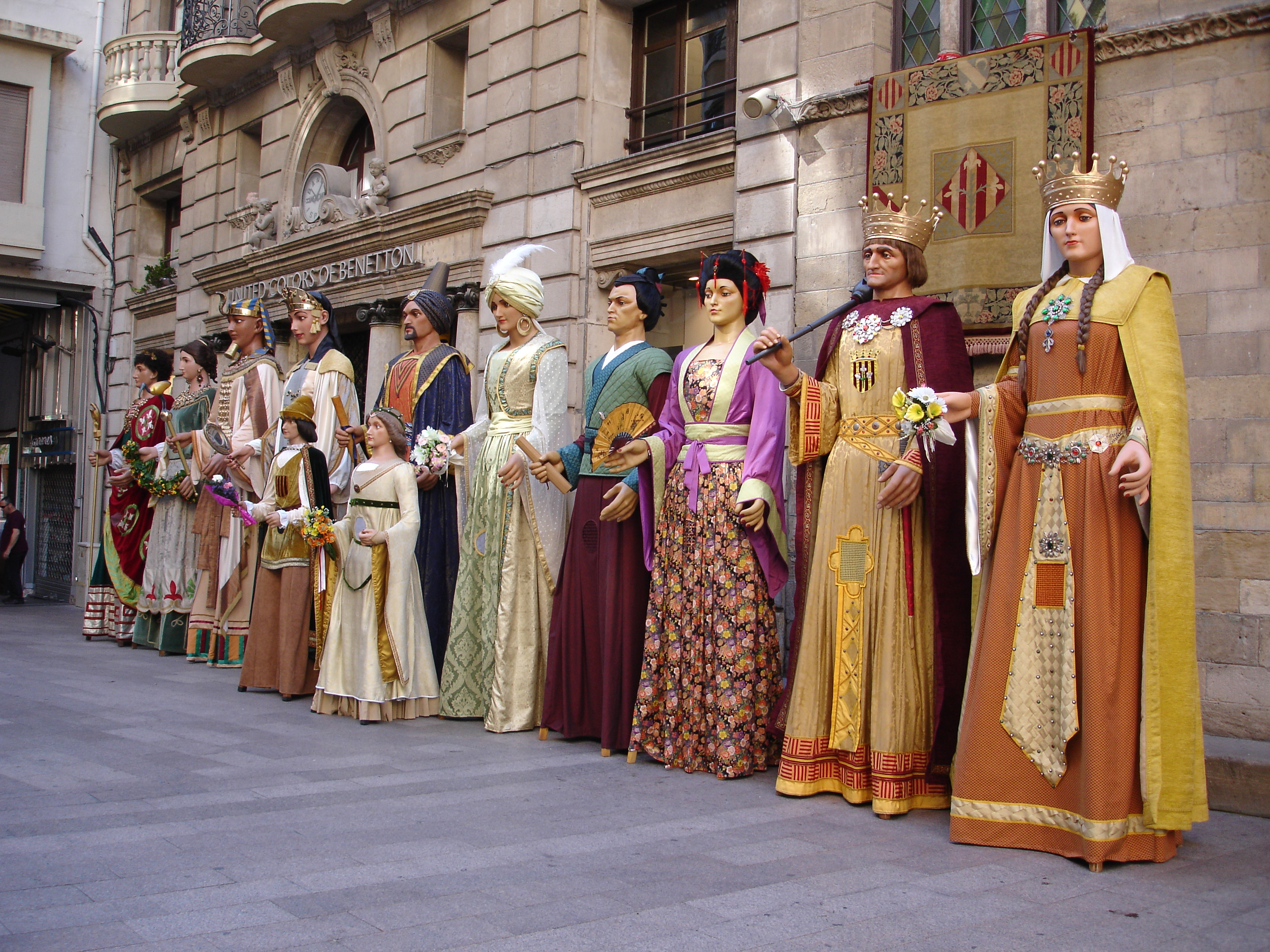
The Giants of Lleida in front of the Paeria

Traditional celebrations include the main annual town festivity: Festa Major; Fira de Sant Miquel and L’Aplec del Caragol (escargot-eating festival, the biggest in the world of this sort, held at the Camps Elisis since 1980).

The latter is a gastronomical festivity focused on escargot cooking and is celebrated yearly at the end of May. "L'Aplec" gathers thousands of people around the table to taste the most traditional dishes from Lleida.

Due to its strong popularity, it was declared a traditional festivity of national interest in 2002 by the Generalitat of Catalonia and two years later it was also declared as such by the Spanish Government.

The main traditional celebrations in Lleida are chaired by the twelve emblematic "Gegants de la Paeria" (Giants of the Town Hall), the two oldest made in 1840.

=== Nightlife ===
Lleida has a bar and clubbing area, informally known as Els Vins. The oldest part of the quarter, known as Els Vins Vells, has been largely replaced by Els Vins Nous, an architecturally newer and more upscale area. Most big clubs in Lleida are located outside the town and are not easily accessible without a car, though on Saturday nights there is a bus.

== Main sights ==
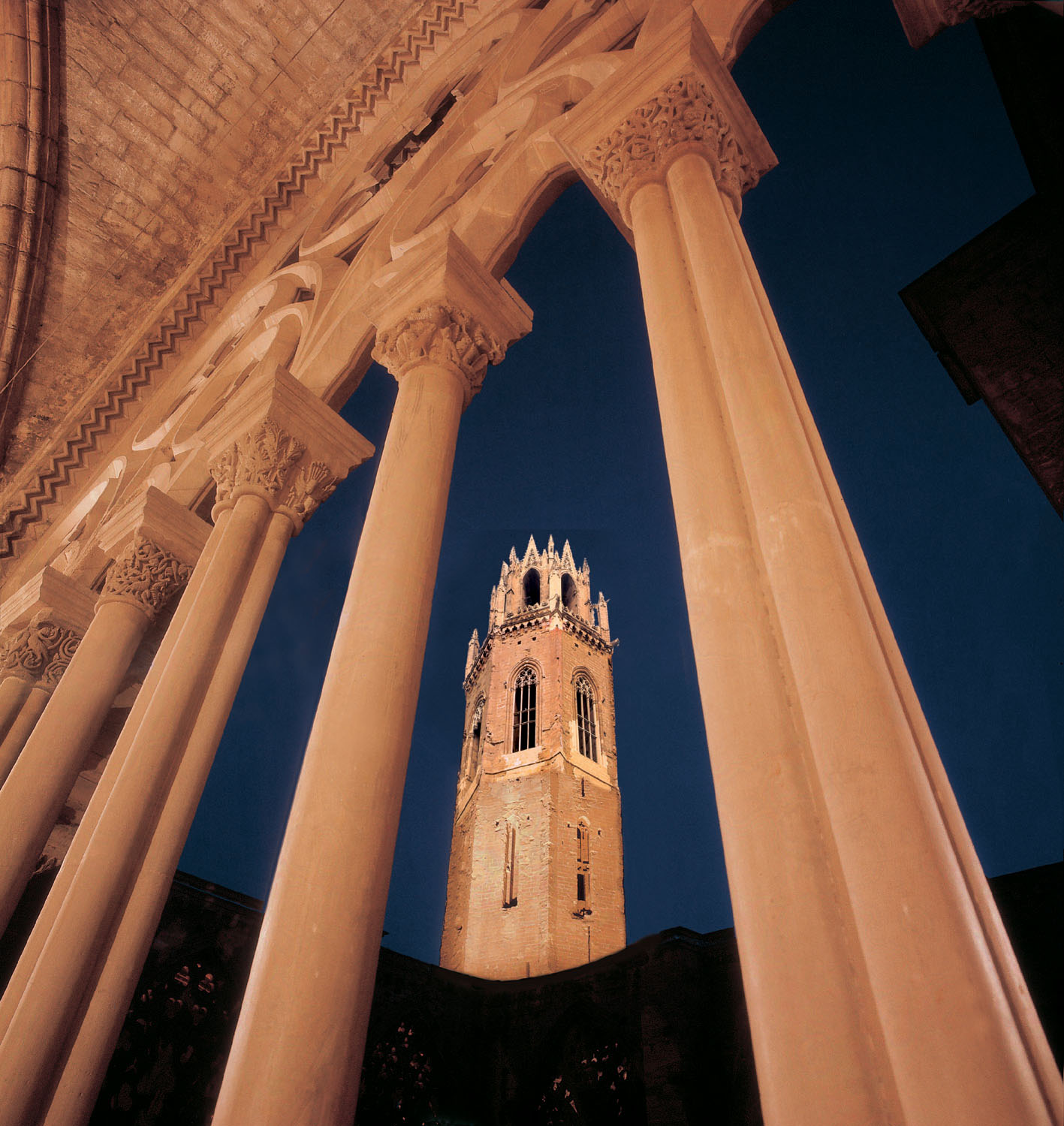
Seu Vella

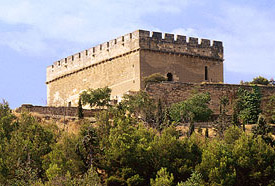
Templar castle of Gardeny

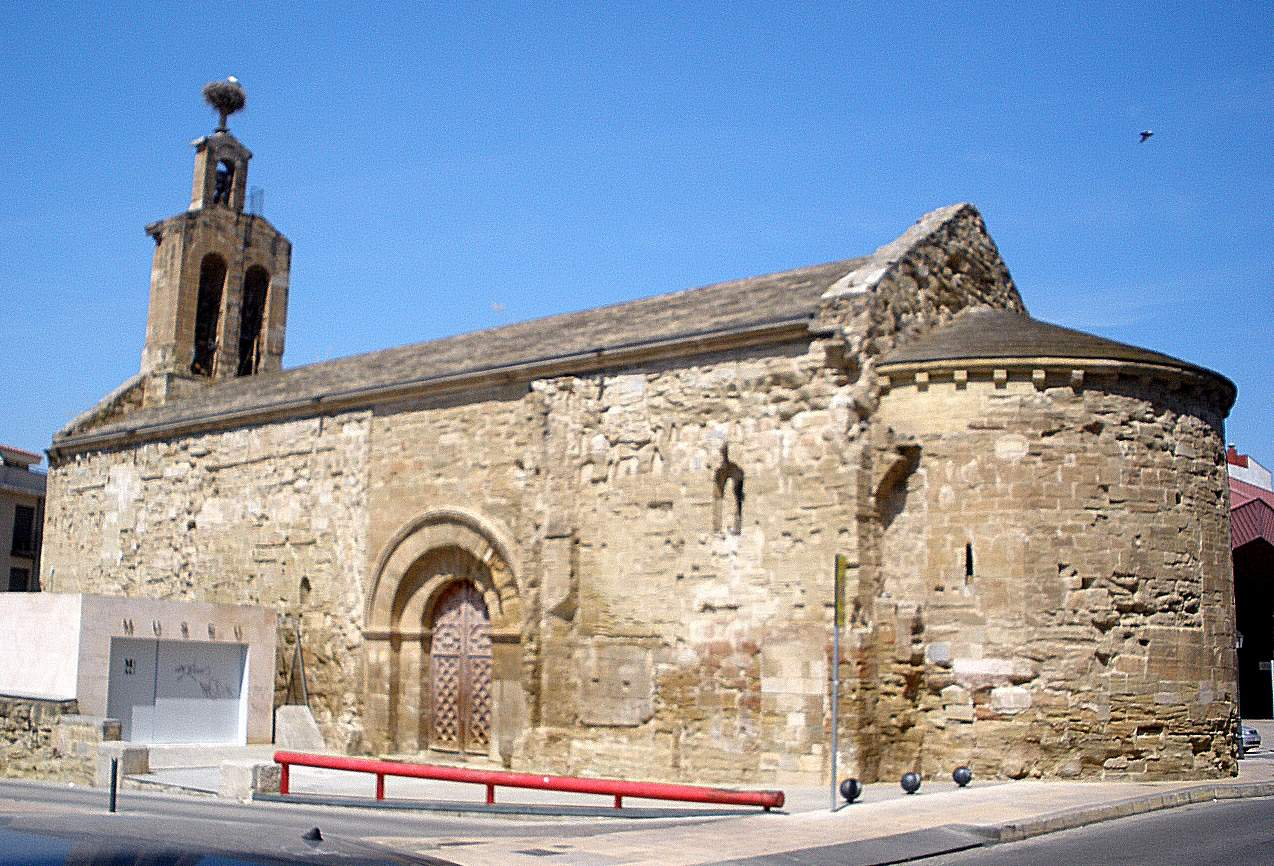
Romanesque church of Sant Martí

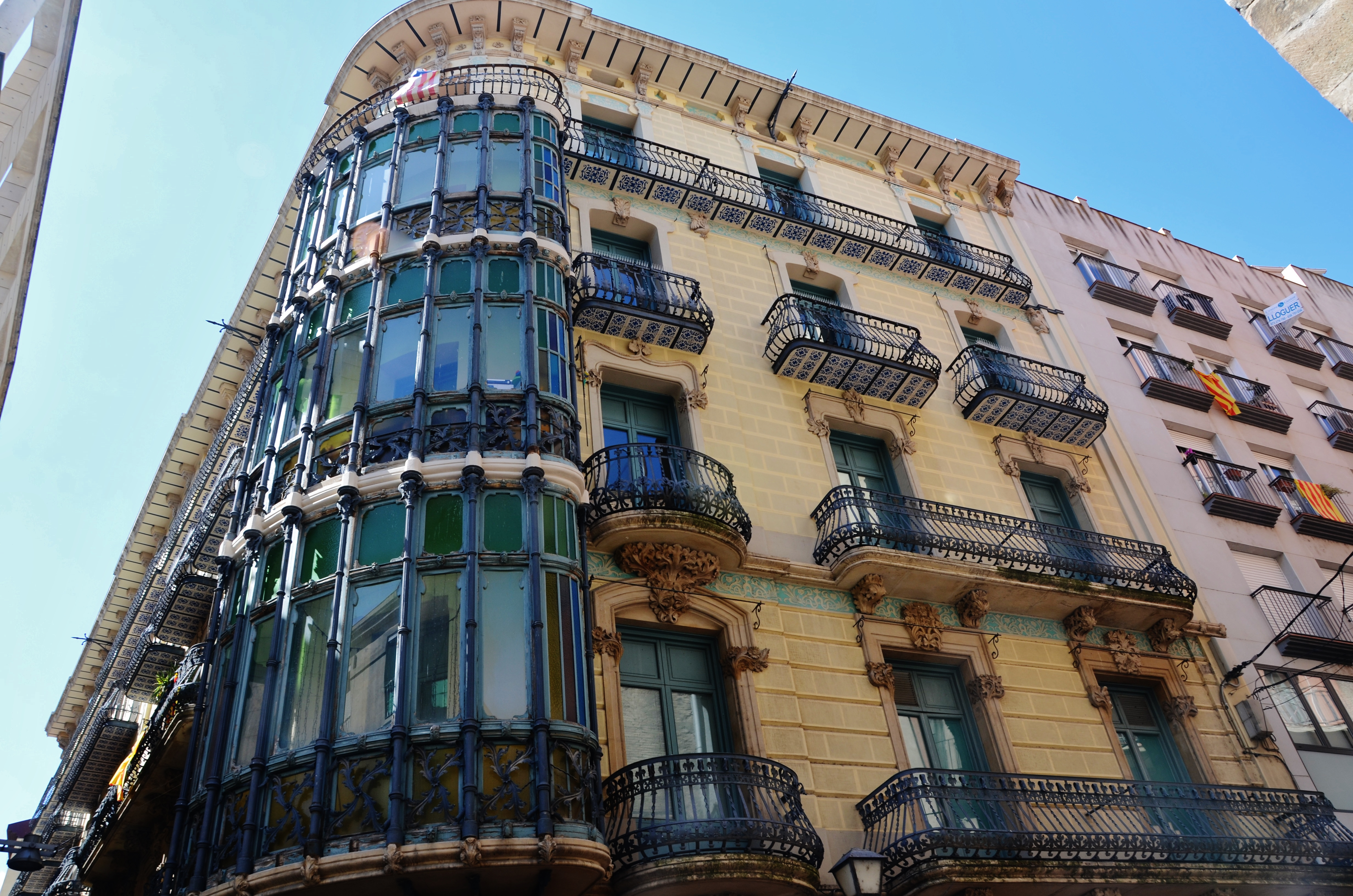
Casa Magí Llorenç, a modernist building

- La Seu Vella, a cathedral built in a blend of Romanesque and Gothic styles over time, and made a military fortress in the 18th century. There is also an older, and mostly destroyed Palau de la Suda, built during Arab rule and later used as a royal residence by the counts of Barcelona and kings of Aragon. Both medieval buildings are situated over the so-called "Turó de la Seu", a medium-sized hill that overlooks the town.
- La Seu Nova, the baroque cathedral, in use since Bourbon rule. It was burnt during the Spanish Civil War by the anarchists commanded by Buenaventura Durruti.
- Institut d'Estudis Ilerdencs, used to be a hospital (Antic Hospital de Santa Maria) built in Gothic style, but today is a historical museum and research centre open to visitors, with historically significant artworks and artefacts from the Iberian, Roman, Arab, medieval and modern times, as well as an exhibit area usually showcasing contemporary local artists.
- La Paeria, the city council and also a historical site with remains and artefacts from Roman times through to the Moorish rule, Mediaeval and Modern times, including old prison cells.
- Gardeny is a hill hosting a fortress built between the 12th and 13th centuries. Used by the Knights Templar in the Middle Ages after the area (a fifth of the town) had been granted to them by King Ramon Berenguer IV.
- The gardens known as Camps Elisis, already used by the Romans. The Mermaid Fountain is a nice piece.
- La Mitjana, a park at the edge of town with wilderness areas adjacent to an old dam on the river Segre.
- Les Basses d'Alpicat, a park. It is currently closed, awaiting reforms.
- Church of Sant Llorenç, a 12th-century Romanesque church with 15th-century Gothic additions. The interior is well preserved.
- Church of Sant Martí, a 12th-century Romanesque church.
- The bishop of Lleida’s Palace on Rambla d'Aragó, which also serves as an art museum displaying pieces spanning from Romanesque to Baroque times.
- El Roser, a 13th-century convent built by the Dominican Order. It hosted a fine arts academy of the same name and has recently been controversially reformed and turned into a Parador (a luxury hotel using a historical location).
- The Cementiri de Lleida (Municipal Cemetery) to the West of the city is listed in the Inventari del Patrimoni Arquitectònic de Catalunya (Inventory of the Architectural Heritage of Catalonia). The oldest portion dates from 1784.
- Lleida Public Library, on Rambla d'Aragó, in the building previously known as La Maternitat, a mid-19th century orphanage.
- Museum of Lleida, opened in 2008, and owned by the Diocese of Lleida focusing on the town's history. Some of the artefacts it contains, which come from areas historically belonging to the diocese but not currently part of the province of Lleida's territory and jurisdiction, have been the object of contention with the neighbouring dioceses and the government of the autonomous community of Aragon.
- Sala Cristòfol, a museum devoted to the works of the avant-garde sculptor Leandre Cristòfol.
- Sala Mercat del Pla, an art gallery.
- Museu d'Art Jaume Morera, an art museum displaying art from the 20th and 21st centuries in a modernist building.
- Centre d'Art de la Panera, a small contemporary art institution.
- Museu de l'Aigua, in Parc de l'Aigua.
- Auditori Enric Granados, Lleida's foremost concert hall. Next to its basement and on public display are some ancient ruins.
- La Llotja de Lleida, a concert hall, theatre, opera and congress hall opened in 2010.
- Parc de l'Aigua, urban park in the southern neighborhoods.

== Sports ==
- Unió Esportiva Lleida, based on the Camp d'Esports dissolved in 2011
- Lleida Esportiu, football club founded in 2011
- CE Lleida Bàsquet, based on the Pavelló Barris Nord
- CE Atlètic Lleida, football club
- SE AEM, women's football club

== Sister cities ==
Lleida has sister relationships with many places worldwide:

- Ferrara, Italy
- Foix, France
- Hefei, China
- Lérida, Colombia
- Perpignan, France
- Monterey, California, United States

== References in culture ==
The city is the subject of the Catalan folk song La Presó de Lleida, "The prison of Lleida", which was already attested in the 17th century and may be even older. It is a very popular tune, covered by many artists such as Joan Manuel Serrat.

== Notable people ==
- Jaume d'Agramunt (?–1350), Catalan doctor and writer, died in Lleida.
- Mariano Gomar de las Infantas (1855–1923), lawyer and Integrist politician
- Casimiro Sangenís Bertrán (1894–1936), Carlist politician.
- Zoe Rosinach Pedrol (1894–1973), born in Lleida; pharmacist and the first Spanish woman to earn a doctorate in Pharmacy.
- Joan Oró (1923–2004), born in Lleida: biochemist, researcher on the origin of life.
- Trini Tinturé (born 1935), born in Lleida: cartoonist and illustrator.
- Sergej Milinković-Savić (born 1995), born in Lleida, professional footballer.

== See also ==
- Battle of Ilerda
- Diocese of Lleida, Bishop of Lleida
- Talarn Dam
- University of Lleida
- Volta a Lleida
