= CaixaForum Lleida =

Cultural centre in Catalonia, Spain

Coordinates: 41°36′46″N 0°37′29″E

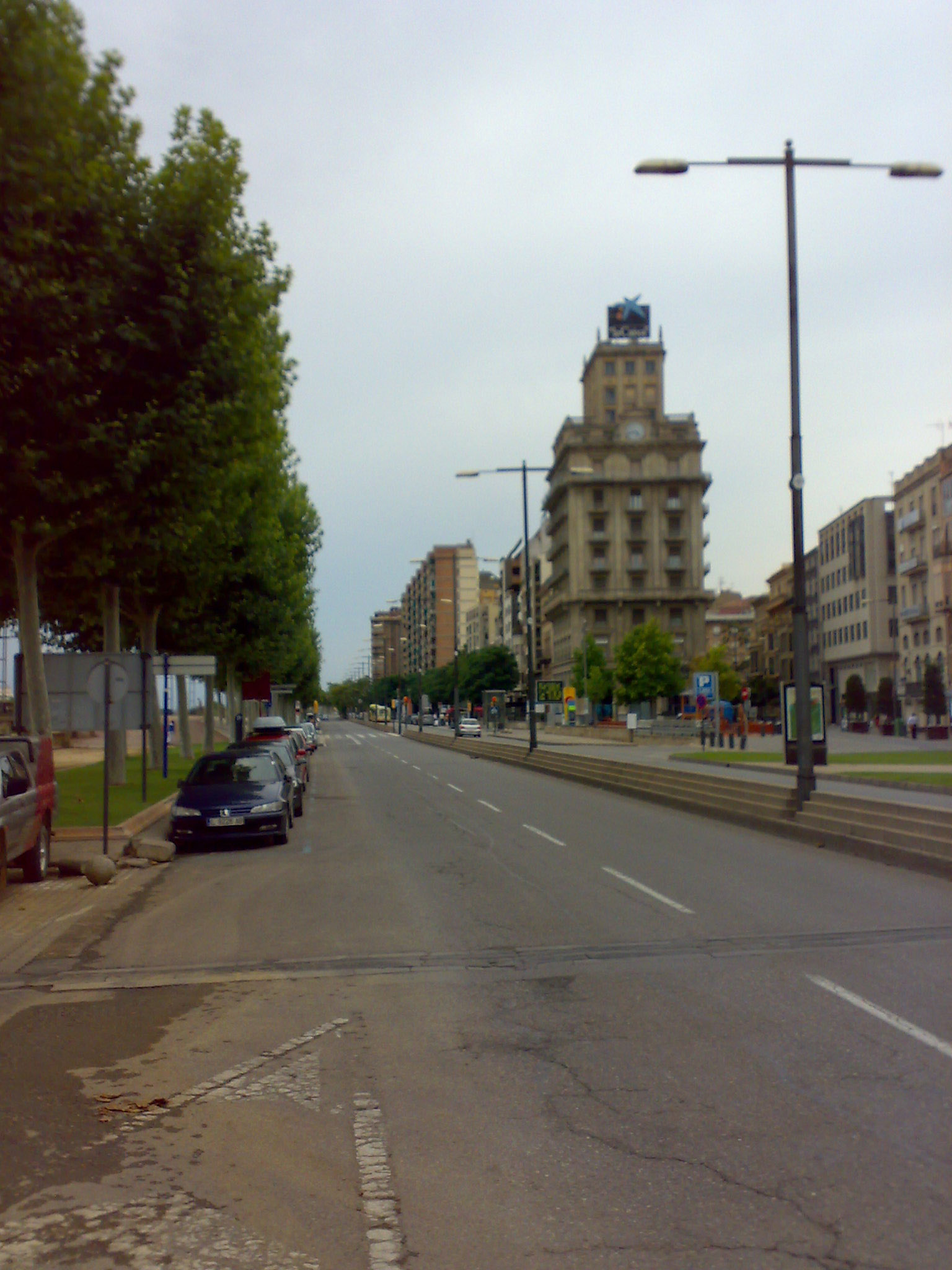
The building hosting CaixaForum Lleida.

CaixaForum is a cultural centre managed by Fundación “La Caixa” located at 3 Avinguda de Blondel, in the city of Lleida, cornering Avinguda de Madrid, in the building popularly known as Montepío after the former name of a bank located in this building. The building, which was the site of Cine Viñes, became the cultural centre of Fundación “La Caixa” in 1989, so we can say that this building has always been related to cultural activities. It was later renamed in 2008 to keep the same naming convention as other centres from La Caixa.

== The building ==
One of the tallest in Lleida, this modernism-inspired building was designed by the architect Francesc de Palau Morera Gatell. Initially, it hosted a movie theatre, Cine Vinyes (the name honouring Ricardo Viñes), and was acquired by La Caixa in 1985. Facilities include exposition areas, an auditorium with 235 seats, and two additional halls with 50 seats each. Contemporary artwork is showcased in the foyer.

== Activities ==
The Lleida Latin-American Film Festival is hosted at CaixaForum. A two seasons-long independent film program takes place in the centre every year under the name of the film cycle Amb veu pròpia.

== Other CaixaForum centres ==
- CaixaForum Barcelona
- CaixaForum Madrid
- CaixaForum Palma
- CaixaForum Tarragona
- CosmoCaixa Barcelona
- CosmoCaixa Madrid

== See also ==
- Culture in Lleida
- Lleida Museum
