= Rambla =

Rambla may refer to:

- Rambla, a synonym of Arroyo (creek), an intermittent or seasonal stream.
- La Rambla, Barcelona, a street in central Barcelona
- Rambla de Catalunya, Barcelona, a major street in Barcelona
- La Rambla, Córdoba, municipality in the province of Córdoba, Spain
- Rambla de Ferran-Estació, neighborhood in Lleida, Catalonia, Spain
- Rambla d'Aragó, Lleida, an important thoroughfare in the Universitat district of Lleida, Catalonia, Spain
- Rambla Just Oliveras (Barcelona Metro), station of the Barcelona Metro
- Rambla of Montevideo, the avenue that goes all along the coastline of Montevideo, Uruguay
- Rambla del Poyo, 41 km Rambla in the Province of Valencia, Spain
- La Rambla (climb), a famously difficult sport climb in Siurana, Catalonia (Spain)

== See also ==
- San Juan de la Rambla, Santa Cruz de Tenerife a municipality in the northern part of the island of Tenerife
- Rambala
- Ramla
- La Rambla (disambiguation)
