= Jaume Cabré =

Catalan philologist, novelist and screenwriter

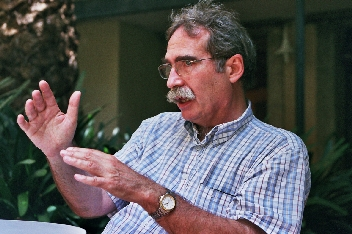
Jaume Cabré

Jaume Cabré i Fabré (Catalan pronunciation: [ˈʒawmə kəˈβɾe]; born 1947) is a Catalan philologist, novelist and screenwriter. He was one of the founders of the Catalan literary collective, Ofèlia Dracs.

He was born in Barcelona and grew up in Terrassa. He graduated in Catalan Philology from the University of Barcelona, is a high-school teacher on leave of absence, professor at the University of Lleida, and a member of the Philological Section of the Institut d'Estudis Catalans.

During many years he has combined literary writing with teaching. He has also worked in television and cinematographic scriptwriting. He collaborated with Joaquim Maria Puyal as creator and scriptwriter of the first Catalan television series: La Granja (1989–1992), followed by other shows like Estació d'Enllaç (1994–1998), Crims (2000) and the made-for-television movies La dama blanca (1987), Nines russes (2003) and Sara (2003). He also wrote, together with Jaume Fuster, Vicenç Villatoro and Antoni Verdaguer, the script for Antoni Verdaguer's films La teranyina (1990), based on his novel, and Havanera (1993).

== His literary work ==
=== The beginnings ===
He started with two collections of short stories: Faules de mal desar (1974) and Toquen a morts (1977).

His first novel, Galceran l'heroi de la guerra negra (1978) brings up the recurrent subjects of his work: power and the human condition. The character of the bandit Jaume Galceran, full of contradictions, is portrayed as a reluctant hero during the War of the Matiners (Second Carlist War).

In the second novel, Carn d'olla (1978), a very different character stands out, Barringa Barranga, an ex-prostitute who has established a network of relationships in the Barcelona neighborhood of Sant Antoni.

In El mirall i l'ombra (The mirror and the shadow—1980) music appears for the first time and, in a certain way, the reflection on the value of artistic creation, which will be constant subjects of his work from this point forward.

In 1980 he published a work of juvenile fiction, the novel La història que en Roc Pons no coneixia and a year later, the short story El blauet.

=== The consolidation ===
During 1984 and 1985 three novels appear that will form the Cicle de Feixes, in which he had worked for many years. In 1984 La teranyina is published, a story set during Barcelona's Tragic Week and which narrates the events of those moments not in Barcelona but in the neighboring fictional city of Feixes, based on the actual city of Terrassa. The fight for political, economic and family power is reflected in the movements of several members of the Rigau family and of the other characters that live in this novel.

The same 1984 sees the publication of Fra Junoy o l'agonia dels sons a novel that develops slowly, like all of Cabré's novels from now on, where, besides the underground movements of the Feixes' ecclesiastical world and the monastery of la Ràpita of which the protagonist friar is the confessor, music plays a very important role. Some of the characters in La teranyina and the world of Feixes are also present in this novel, which in a certain way is its continuation. It highlights the figure of Fra Junoy, who is a kind of victim of those who have the power of manipulation.

In 1985 the final chapter of the Freixes Cycle Luvowski o la desraó was published as a novelette, in a larger collection of short stories: Llibre de preludis, in which music plays an even more prominent role.

In 1984 Cabré published his second work of juvenile fiction: L'home de Sau.

=== Maturity ===
In 1991 Senyoria is released, a novel about the judicial corruption that emanates from absolute power, set in Barcelona at the end of the 18th century. If with Fra Junoy he painted a victim, now with don Rafel Massó, the civil regent of the Court of Barcelona, he paints the figure of the hangman, with all his fears and selfishness.

L'ombra de l'eunuc (1996) is a novel that recounts the last years of Franquism, the Transition and the years that followed from the author's perspective, personified in Miquel Gensana, the protagonist. At the same time it is a novel of reflection about artistic creation and, especially, about creating music. The story structure is based on the structure of Alban Berg's Concerto for violin and orchestra.

While Cabré began work on the following novel, he also began to branch out into other genres. In 1999 he published El sentit de la ficció, an essay on literary creation, writing, and about his own cooking.

In 2000 there is a return to fiction with Viatge d'hivern, a collection of fourteen stories that are interrelated by hidden impulses. The reader keeps on discovering these relationships as he advances in the stories; and the ties remain even though each story is set in very different places and periods. It is a look at a Europe that we have not been able to construct in any other way.

The following year, 2001, he published and performed for the first time in the Teatre Nacional de Catalunya, with the play Pluja seca, in which he wrote about forgery of the historical memory and about the fact that history is written by the victors. The drama starts in the castle at Peníscola, which has been converted into a Papish court (true for them, schismatic for Rome) on the day that Benedict XIII dies and the decimated cardenalici school decides to nominate a successor who is viewed in Rome as an antipope.

Les veus del Pamano (2004) begins in the forties, in a little village at the foot of the Catalan Pyrenees, Pallars Sobirà, and it continues to the present day, with a parade of characters like the teachers Oriol Fontelles and Tina Bros, or the woman Elisenda Vilabrú. The historical memory, the impossibility of forgiveness and the fear to forget are some of the subjects that turn up in this novel.

In 2005 he published his second essay: La matèria de l'esperit about literary reading.

His latest novel, Jo confesso (Confessions), was published in Catalan in 2011. In it, the author reflects on the concept of evil throughout human history through the life of a cultured and intelligent main character born in post-Civil War Barcelona. The English edition was published in 2015 by Arcadia Books in London.

== Bibliography ==
=== Collections of short stories ===
- Faules de mal desar (Ed. Selecta. Barcelona, 1974).
- Toquen a morts (Ed. La Magrana. Barcelona, 1977).
- Tarda lliure (1981) (Premi “Recull”, 1980).
- Llibre de preludis (Ed. 62. Barcelona, 1985). Ed. Proa. B, 2002.
- Viatge d’hivern (Ed. Proa. Barcelona, 2000).

=== Novels ===
- Galceran, l’heroi de la guerra negra (Ed. Proa, Barcelona).
- Carn d’olla. (Ed. Moll. Majorca, 1978). Ed. Proa, B 1999).
- El mirall i l’ombra (Ed. Laia. Barcelona, 1980).
- La teranyina (Edicions Proa, Barcelona, 1984).
- Fra Junoy o l’agonia dels sons (Ed. 62, B. 1984) Ed. Proa, B. 1998.
- Senyoria (1991) (Editorial Proa, Barcelona).
- El llibre de Feixes (La trilogia de Feixes) (Ed. Proa. Barcelona, 1996).
- L’ombra de l’eunuc (Ed. Proa. Barcelona, 1996).
- Les veus del Pamano (Ed. Proa. Barcelona, 2004).
- Jo confesso (Ed. Proa. Barcelona, 2011).
- Consumits pel foc (Ed. Proa, Barcelona 2021)

=== Essay ===
- El sentit de la ficció (Ed. Proa. Barcelona, 1999).
- La matèria de l’esperit (Ed. Proa. Barcelona 2005).
- Les incerteses (Ed. Proa. Barcelona 2015).

=== Theater ===
- Pluja seca (Ed. Proa-TNC. Barcelona, gener de 2001).

=== Juvenile Fiction ===
- La història que en Roc Pons no coneixia (Ed. La Galera. B. 1980).
- L’any del blauet (Ed. Barcanova, Barcelona 1981).
- L’home de Sau (Ed. La Galera, Barcelona, 1985).

=== Scripts ===
- La dama blanca (TV movie) (1987).
- La teranyina (radio) (1988).
- Fins que la mort ens separi (radio) (1989).
- La granja (TV series) (1989–1992).
- La teranyina (film) (1990).
- Havanera (film) (1993).
- Estació d’enllaç (TV series) (1994–1998).
- Crims (TV series) (2000).
- Nines russes (TV movie) (2003).
- Sara (TV movie) (2003).

=== Translated works ===
- Translations of Senyoria
  - Spanish. Señoría (trans. Daniel Royo). Ed. Grijalbo-Mondadori. Barcelona, 1993. 2nd edition: Random House- Mondadori. Barcelona, 2005).
  - Hungarian. Ömeltósága (trans. Tomcsányi Zsuzsanna.) Ed. Európa. Budapest, 2001.
  - Romanian. Excelenta (trans. Jana Balacciu Matei) Ed. Merònia. Bucharest, 2002.
  - Galician. Señoría (trans. Dolores Martínez Torres) Ed Galaxia. Vigo, 2002.
  - French. Sa Seigneurie (trans. Bernard Lesfargues) (Christian Bourgois Éditeur. Paris, 2004).
  - Portuguese. Sua Senhoria (trans. Jorge Fallorca). Tinta da China ediçôes. Lisboa, 2007.
  - Albanian. Senjoria (trans. Bashkim Shehu). Institui i Librit & Komunikimit. Tirana, 2008.
  - Italian. Signoria (trans. Ursula Bedogni) Ed. la Nuova Frontiera. Roma, 2009
  - German. Senyoria (trans. Kirsten Brandt) Suhrkamp Verlag. Frankfurt, 2009.
  - Dutch. Edelachtbare (trans. Pieter Lamberts & Joan Garrit). uitgeverij Signatuur. Utrecht, 2010.
  - Slovene. Sodnik (trans. Simona Škrabec). Beletrina. Ljubljana, 2018.
- Translations of L'ombra de l'eunuc
  - Lithuanian. "Eunucho šešėlis" (trans. Valdas V. Petrauskas) Alma littera. Vilnius, 2019.
  - Hungarian. Az eunuch Árnyéka (trans. Tomcsányi Zsuzsanna.) Európa könyvkiadó. Budapest, 2004.
  - Romanian. Umbra eunucului (trans. Jana Balacciu Matei). Editorial Meronia Bucarest, 2004.
  - French. L'ombre de l'eunuque (trans: Bernard Lesfargues) Christian Bourgois Éditeur, 2006.
  - Slovene. Evnuhova senca (trans. Simona Škrabec) Študentska založba - Beletrina. Ljubljana, 2006.
  - Italian L'ombra dell'eunuco (trad. Stefania Maria Ciminelli) La Nuova Frontiera, Roma 2010
  - Polish Cień eunucha (trans. Anna Sawicka), Wydawnictwo Marginesy, Warszawa 2016
  - Greek. Η σκιά του ευνούχου (trans. Evriviadis Sofos). Polis publications (εκδόσεις ΠΟΛΙΣ), Athens, 2019
- Translations of Les veus del Pamano
  - Hungarian. To Pamano zúgása (trans. Tomcsányi Zsuzsanna) Európa könyvkiadó. Budapest, 2006.
  - Spanish. Las voces del Pamano (trans. Palmira Feixas). Editorial Destino. Barcelona, 2007
  - German. Die Stimmen des Flusses (trans. Kirsten Brandt). Insel-Suhrkamp Verlag. Frankfurt, 2007.
  - Dutch. De stemmen van de Pamano (trans. Pieter Lamberts & Joan Garrit). uitgeverij Signatuur. Utrecht, 2007.
  - Italian. Le voci del fiume (trans. Stefania Maria Ciminelli). La Nuova Frontiera. Roma, 2007.
  - Portuguese. As vozes do rio Pamano (trans. Jorge Fallorca). Tinta da China ediçôes. Lisboa, 2008.
  - Romanian. Vocile lui Pamano (trans. Jana Balacciu Matei). Editura Meronia Bucarest 2008.
  - French. Les voix du Pamano (trans. Bernard Lesfargues). Christian Bourgois éditeur. París 2009.
  - Norwegian. Stemmene fra Pamano (trans. Kjell Risvik). Cappelen Damm. Oslo, 2009.
  - Greek. Οι φωνές του ποταμού Παμάνο (trans. Evriviadis Sofos). Papyros Public Group. Athens, 2008.
  - Slovene. Šumenje Pamana (trans. Veronika Rot). Učila International, 2010.
  - Croatian. Glasovi Pamana (trans. Boris Dumančić). Fraktura, 2012.
  - Serbian. Glasovi reke (trans. Silvija Monros Stojaković) Beograd, 2014
  - Polish. Głosy Pamano (trans. Anna Sawicka). Wydawnictwo Marginesy, 2014.
- Translations of Fra Junoy o l'agonia dels sons
  - Spanish. Fray Junoy o la agonía de los sonidos. (trans. Enrique Sordo). Espasa-Calpe. Madrid, 1988.
  - Hungarian Junoy barát, avagy a hangok halála (trans. Tomcsányi Zsuzsanna) Európa könyvkiadó. Budapest, 2009.
- Translation of Viatge d'hivern
  - English. Winter journey (trans. Pat Lunn) Swan Isle Press. Chicago, 2009.
  - Spanish. Viaje de invierno (trans. Concha Cardeñoso Sáenz de Miera) Ed. Destino. Barcelona, 2014.
  - Korean. 겨울 여행 (trans. Garam Kwon) Minumsa. Seoul, 2024.
- Translations of La teranyina
  - Spanish. La telaraña. (trans. Enrique Sordo). Argos-Vergara, Barcelona, 1984.
  - French. La toile d'araignée (trans. Patrick Gifreu). Editions Du Chiendent 1985.
- Translations of Llibre de preludis
  - Spanish. Libro de preludios. (trans. Enrique Sordo). Espasa-Calpe. Madrid, 1989.
- Translations of Jo confesso
  - Lithuanian. "Prisipažįstu" (trans. Valdas V. Petrauskas) Alma littera. Vilnius, 2016
  - English. Confessions (trans. Mara Faye Lethem) Arkadia Books. London 2014
  - Polish. Wyznaję (trans. Anna Sawicka). Wydawnictwo Marginesy, 2013.
  - Spanish. Yo confieso. (trans. Concha Cardeñoso Sáenz de Miera). Destino. Barcelona, 2011
  - German. Das Schweigen des Sammlers. (trans. Kirsten Brandt i Petra Zickmann). Insel Verlag. Berlin 2011
  - Italian. Io confesso. (trans. Stefania Maria Ciminelli). Rizzoli. Milano 2012
  - Dutch. De Bekentenis van Adrià (trad. Pieter Lamberts & Joan Garrit) Uitgeverij Signatuur. Utrecht 2013
  - French. Confiteor (trans. Edmond Raillard) Ed. Actes Sud. Arles 2013
  - Albanian. Unë Rrefehem (trans. Bashkim Shehu) Institui i Dialogut dhe Komunikimit. Tiranë 2013
  - Danish. Jeg bekender (trans. Ane-Grethe Østergaard) Turbine Forlaget. Aarhus 2014
  - Norwegian. Jeg bekjenner (trans. Kjell Risvik) Cappelens Damm Forlag. Oslo 2014
  - Hungarian. Én vétkem (trans. Tomcsányi Zsuzsanna) Libri Kyadó. Budapest 2014
  - Turkish. İtiraf Ediyorum (trans. Suna Kılıç) Alef Yayınevi. Istanbul 2015
  - Czech. Přiznávám, že… (trans. Jan Schejbal) Dybbuk. Praha 2015
  - Russian. "Я исповедуюсь" (trans. Ekaterina Guschina, et al) Inostranka. Moscow 2015
  - Korean. 나는 고백한다 1,2,3 (trans. Garam Kwon) Ed. Minumsa. Seoul 2020
  - Greek. Confiteor (trans. Evriviadis Sofos). Polis publications (εκδόσεις ΠΟΛΙΣ), Athens, 2016
- Translations of L'home de Sau (child novel)
  - Spanish. El hombre de Sau (trans. Mercedes Caballud). La Galera, Barcelona, 1986.
- Translations of La història que en Roc Pons no coneixia (child novel)
  - Spanish. El extraño viaje que nadie se creyó. (trans. Mercedes Caballud). La Galera. Barcelona 1981.

== Literary prizes ==
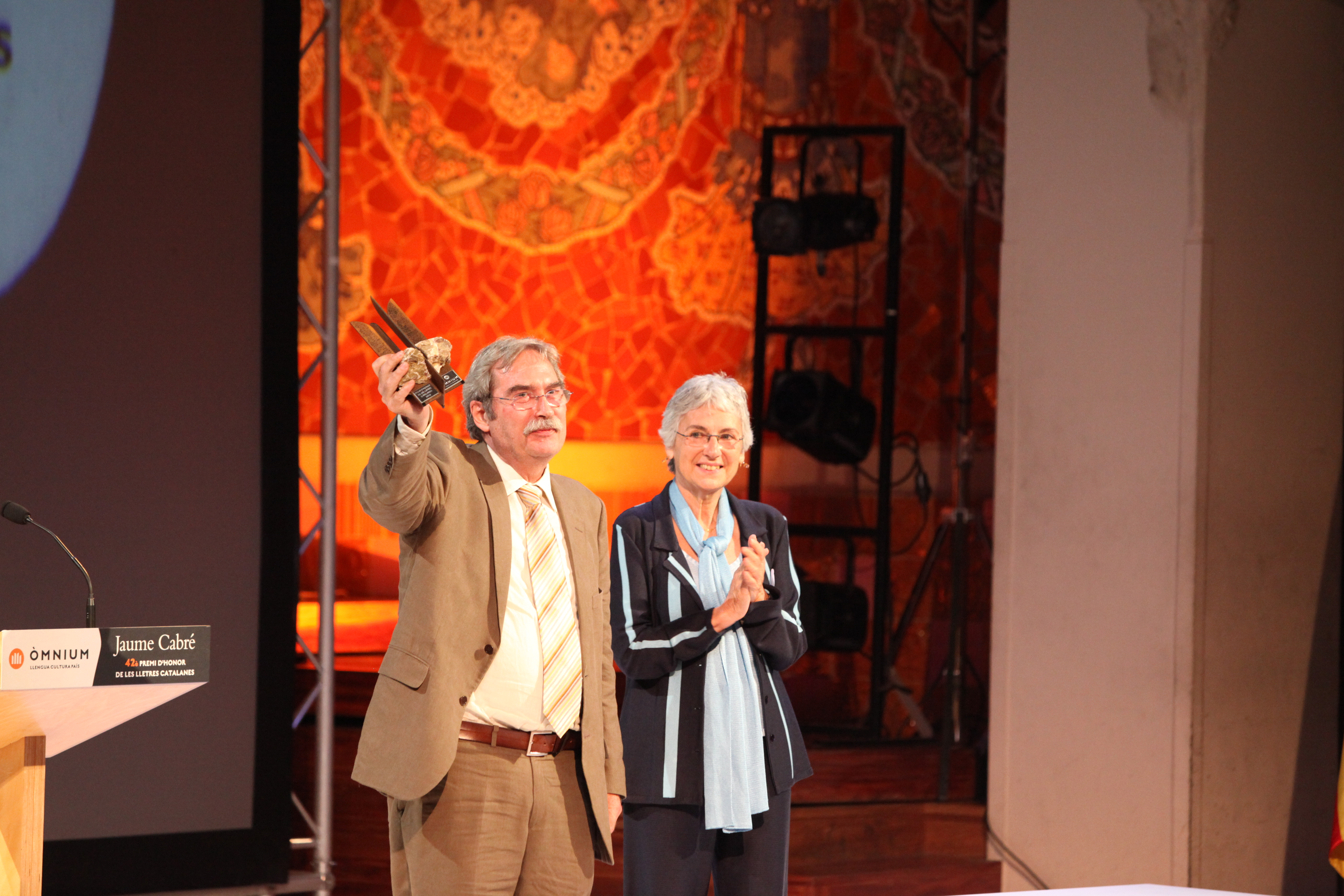
Jaume Cabré receiving award with Muriel Casals, Palau de la Música Catalana.

- Víctor Català, 1973. Atrafegada calor
- Fastenrath, 1980. Carn d'olla
- Recull, 1980. Tarda lliure
- Serra d'Or Critics, 1981. La història que en Roc Pons no coneixia
- Sant Jordi, 1983. La teranyina
- Prudenci Bertrana, 1983. Fra Junoy o l'agonia dels sons
- Serra d'Or Critics, 1985. Fra Junoy o l'agonia dels sons
- Spanish Critics, 1985. Fra Junoy o l'agonia dels sons
- Crexells, 1991.
- Readers of “El Temps”. Senyoria
- Prudenci Bertrana, 1992. Senyoria
- Serra d'Or Critics, 1992. Senyoria
- Spanish Critics, 1992. Senyoria
- Prix Méditerranée 2004 to the best foreign novel. Sa Seigneurie
- National Prize of Literature, 1992. La granja
- City of Barcelona, 1997. L'ombra de l'eunuc
- Serra d'Or Critics, 1997 .L'ombra de l'eunuc
- Lletra d'Or, 1997. L'ombra de l'eunuc
- Fundació Enciclopèdia Catalana, 1999 Viatge d’hivern
- Crítica Serra d’Or, 2001 Viatge d’hivern
- Catalan writers prize to the literary trajectory, 2003
- Catalan Critics, 2005. Les veus del Pamano
- Premi d'Honor de les Lletres Catalanes, 2010
- Maria Àngels Anglada Prize, 2012. Jo confesso
