= Mitja =

Mitja may refer to:

- Mitja (given name), a Slovene given name
- Mitjà, a Catalan surname
  - Oriol Mitjà (born 1980), Catalan researcher and physician
