= Avinguda de Catalunya, Lleida =

Road in Lérida

Coordinates: 41°36′41″N 0°37′15″E

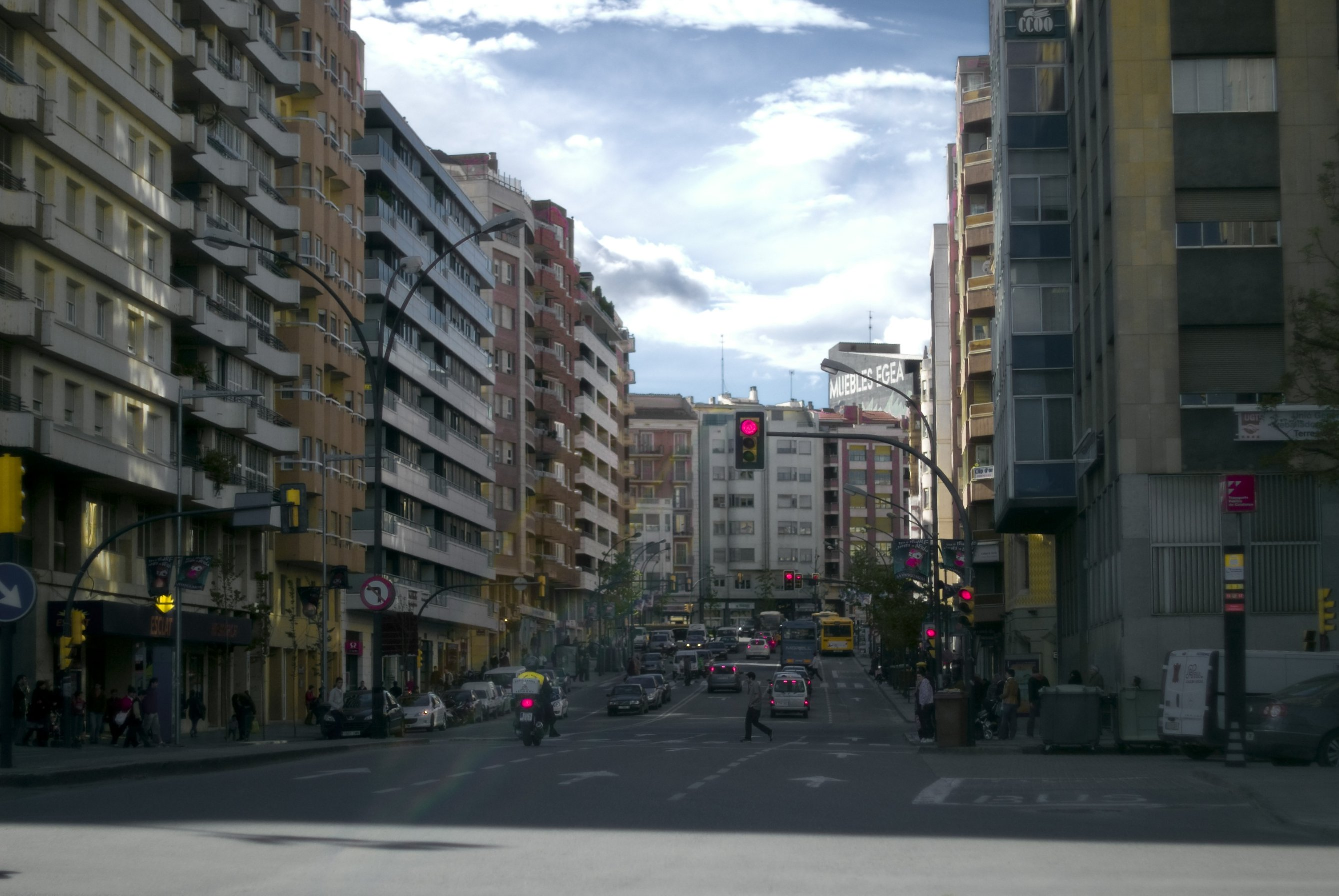
View from outside the coach station.

Avinguda de Catalunya (Catalan for Avenue of Catalonia) is a thoroughfare in the city of Lleida, Spain. On one end it is a prolongation of Rambla d'Aragó while on the other it meets Plaça d'Espanya and the river Segre. An extension into the Cappont neighbourhood, on the other side of the river, through the Pont de la Universitat, is underway. Most buildings are relatively recent, and include the infamous Edifici dels Sindicats, or Labor Union building, also called the "Ducados building" because of its alleged resemblance to a Ducados blue cigarette box. Demonstrations in Lleida usually go through Avinguda de Catalunya. The Lleida coach station, a rather decayed infrastructure, lies on one of the ends of the avenue as of 2010. It will be replaced by a newer structure near the Lleida-Pirineus railway station.

== See also ==
- Lleida coach station
- List of streets and squares in Lleida
