= La granja (1989 TV series) =

- Genre: Soap opera
- Created by: Joaquim Maria Puyal and Jaume Cabré
- Starring: Xavier Serrat; Rosa Serra; Pepita Oliveras; Elisa Hermosa; Pepa López; Joan Borràs
- Country of origin: Spain
- Original language: Catalan
- No. of episodes: 117

Production
- Producer: Televisió de Catalunya
- Production location: Barcelona

Original release
- Release: 1989 – 1992

La granja (Catalan: The farm) is a Spanish television series produced by Catalan-language channel TV3 about a family that owns a pub in Barcelona. It aired from 1989 to 1992.

== Context ==
In 1989, Joaquin Maria Puyal was assigned as director and presenter of a debate program that aired on Friday nights, La Vida en un XIP, just after the news. In order to maintain viewers, he decided to create a small series of fiction that would link the news and the debate program, with a plot that would be related to the topic addressed.
