= Antoni Gelonch Viladegut =

Catalan lawyer and art patron (born 1956)

- Born: 1956 (age 69–70); Lleida, Catalonia, Spain
- Occupations: Lawyer, writer, art collector
- Known for: Founder of the Gelonch Viladegut Collection; donation to the Museu de Lleida
- Awards: Cross of Saint George (2023)
- Website: gelonchviladegut.com

Antoni Gelonch Viladegut (Lleida, 1956) is a Catalan lawyer, writer, patron, and art promoter. He has assembled and donated to the Museu de Lleida one of the most important art collections in Europe.

== Biography ==
He studied Law and Pharmacy at the University of Barcelona, further complementing his education with Business Administration at IESE Business School, and courses in Grenoble and Harvard. His first job was as a pharmacist at the Hospital of Sant Pau, before spending ten years in public administration, where he served as chief of staff to the Minister of Education and as director of a program in the Department of Health. He then worked for 17 years in multinational pharmaceutical companies, before deciding to focus on his work as an art promoter and writer.

He built the Gelonch Viladegut Collection of prints and art books, which includes works of great quality and significance, considered one of the most relevant in Europe. In 2020, he deposited the collection at the Museu de Lleida. The collection brings together more than a thousand prints and art books, including works by Dürer, Rembrandt, Goya, Picasso, Dalí, Miró, Lichtenstein, and Chillida.

Gelonch is an honorary member of the Royal Catalan Academy of Fine Arts of Saint George and president of the Circle of the MUHBA and the Circle of the Frederic Marès Museum in Barcelona. In 2023, he was awarded the Cross of Saint George by the Government of Catalonia. He received the distinction "for his significant efforts in favor of the preservation and promotion of art."
