= L'Aplec del Caragol =

Annual event

Coordinates: 41.614030°N 0.632057°E

L’Aplec del Caragol
- Genre: Gastronomic demonstration
- Dates: 26-28 May 2023
- Locations: Lleida, Catalonia, Spain
- Years active: 1980-2019, 2022-
- Founded: 1980
- Attendance: 200,000
- Website: http://aplec.org/

L'Aplec del Caragol is a meeting that is held annually, on a weekend in May, on the banks of the river Segre and the Champs Elysees in Lleida since 1980. It is a gastronomic event where snails are the protagonists and which incorporates music, brass bands and parades through the city. In 2010 there were 200,000 visitors and twelve tons of snails were consumed. These are shipped in from Spain, North Africa and South America.

Apart from the snail feast, the event includes numerous other activities such as concerts and charanga music, castells, performances, and competitions.

== History ==
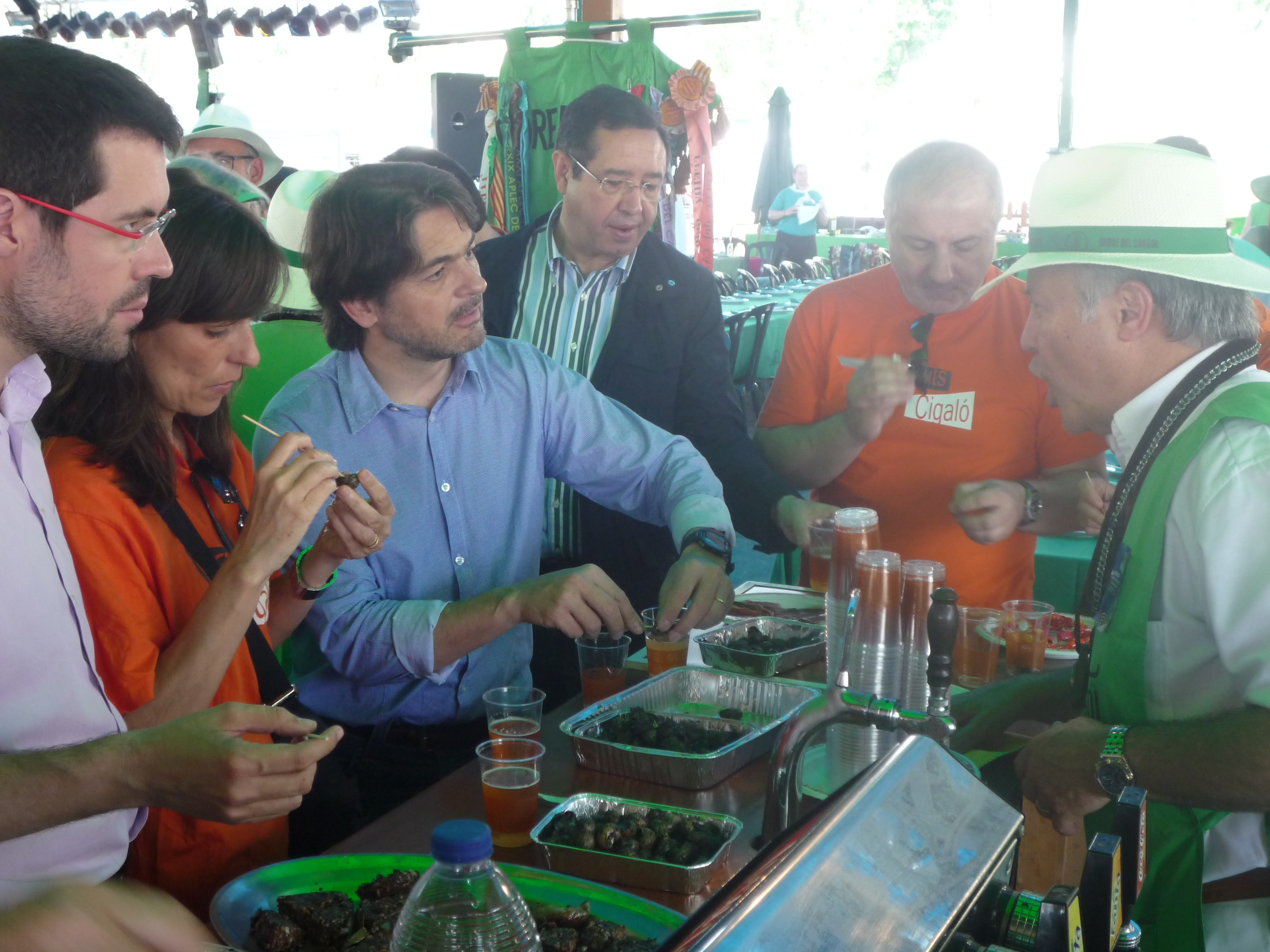

In 1980, with about 12 clubs an event which incorporated a parade through the city of Lleida was born. About 300 club members participated in the first Aplec and around 4,000 visitors attended the first gastronomic demonstration of Lleida.

The club of the Order of Caragol was l’Aplec’s mother club. The Order of Caracol gathered a group of 18 clubs to spend the day on the shore of river Segre. Thus they asked collaboration and authorization to the Lleida City Council to make the Aplec in the poplar grove next to the river in the neighborhood of Cappont.

On April 1, 1981, the Order of Caragol sent the first notice to the clubs where they informed of the main agreements adopted at the last meeting of representatives of clubs and of the registration of 34 clubs and 2,300 participants in the following Aplec del Caragol.

Also in 1981, the Aplequet or Aplec de Tardor was born. In the first weekend of October, it gathered up to 60 clubs and 3,000 club members with a tribute to the origins of Aplec when it was a one-day celebration.

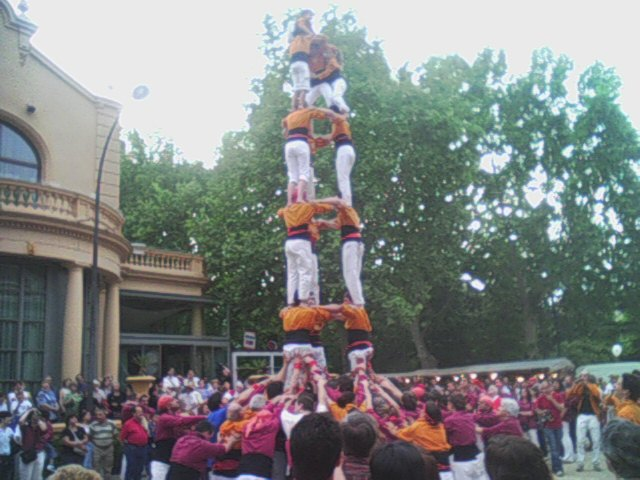
Acrobatic formation at the 2005 gathering

In the fourth celebration of l’Aplec del Caragol an album with folk songs from Lleida including one dedicated to the snail was recorded. In 1986, l'Aplec del Caragol was included in the program of la Festa Major de Lleida. A week before the celebration of l'Aplec, on May 8, 1988, Lleida entered the Guinness Book of Records with the achievement of a world record: the realization of the world's largest tray of snails. In 1990 a new edition of the album l’Aplec del Caragol was presented with nine popular songs from Lleida with lyrics and music of the brothers Angel and Joan Martinez and with the collaboration of Manuel Peralta, Eduardo Quijada and the Federation of Clubs of l 'Aplec.

In 1994 the first democratic assembly of the Aplec is constituted. The Aplec of 1997 was starred with the celebration of the first Cultural Week and the first Caragol Rock, with the participation of Terrorvision, Los Sencillos and Café Soul.

Aplec went on hiatus in 2020-21.
