= Jarama (disambiguation) =

Jarama is a river in central Spain.

Jarama may refer to:

- Lamborghini Jarama
- Circuito del Jarama
- Jarama (Madrid Metro)
