= Jesús Barranco =

Spanish writer and forestry engineer (born 1976)

Jesús Barranco Reyes
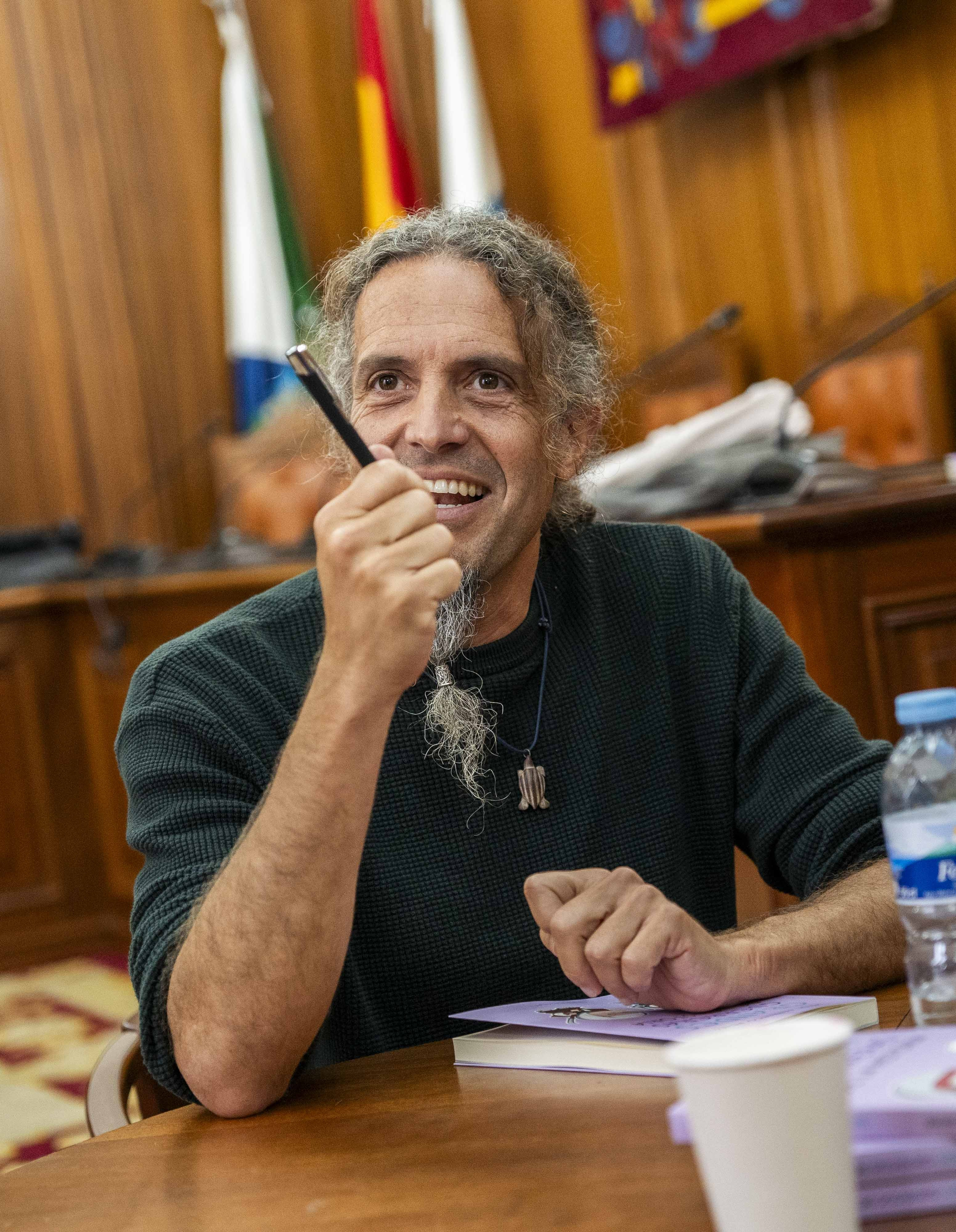
- Born: 11 November 1976 (age 50); Tenerife, Canary Islands, Spain
- Education: Polytechnic University of Madrid; University of Lleida; National University of Distance Education
- Occupations: Engineer, writer
- Writing career
- Notable works: Grandes liadas de la Historia, Grandes guerreras de la Historia, Guerras Absurdas de la Historia, "Gestas y singularidades de la Historia"
- Website: www.jesusbarranco.com

Jesus Barranco Reyes (born 11 November 1976, in Tenerife) is a Spanish writer and forestry engineer from the Canary Islands.

== Education ==
Barranco graduated as a forestry engineer from the Polytechnic University of Madrid (UPM) in 2002, and as a wildfire manager MSc from the University of Lleida (UdL) in 2015. He is finishing a geography and history degree at the National University of Distance Education (UNED).

== Writing career ==
Barranco's first known book was a wildfire-fighting handbook, Manual de lucha contra incendios forestales. It was first distributed in 2018 through Amazon and was later republished in 2025 by Ediciones Singularidad.

In 2023, he published Grandes Liadas de la Historia (Great Historic Fiascos), a humorous and sarcastic book about various historical disasters, released by Caligrama. After three editions, the book was revised and republished by Ediciones Singularidad in 2024. In 2025, this book was also published in English, in a translation by Timothy Bruce Allen.

Also in 2024, Barranco published a compilation of episodes related to women in warfare, titled Grandes guerreras de la historia (Great Female Warriors in History), written in a similarly sharp and humorous style and focused on the lives of women involved in armed conflicts.

In 2025, he published Guerras absurdas de la historia (Absurd Wars in History), a book about singular and hardly justifiable conflicts that began for highly unusual reasons.

In 2026, he published his fourth history book, Gestas y singularidades de la historia (Deeds and Oddities of History), a work built around the idea that history is full of exploits and remarkable episodes that deserve to be remembered not only for what happened, but also for what they meant to later generations.

== Bibliography ==
- Gestas y singularidades de la historia [Deeds and Oddities of History] (in Spanish). Tenerife, Canary Islands: Singularidad Ediciones. 16 March 2026. ISBN 979-1399127539.
- Manual de Lucha contra Incendios Forestales: Nivel Básico e Intermedio [Wildfire Fighting Handbook: Basic and Intermediate]. Amazon. 2019. ISBN 979-8-6264-8699-5.
- Grandes Liadas de la Historia [Great Fiascos in History]. Caligrama. 2023. ISBN 978-84-19639-66-0.
- Grandes Liadas de la Historia [Great Fiascos in History] (in Spanish) (3rd ed.). Ediciones Singularidad. 2024. ISBN 978-84-121094-8-1.
- Grandes Guerreras de la Historia [Great Female Warriors in History] (in Spanish) (3rd ed.). Ediciones Singularidad. 2024. ISBN 978-84-121094-9-8.
- Great Fiascos in History. Tenerife, Spain: Ediciones Singularidad. 2025. ISBN 978-8412921571.
- Guerras Absurdas de la Historia [Absurd Wars in History] (in Spanish) (2nd ed.). Tenerife, Spain: Ediciones Singularidad. 2025. ISBN 978-8412921519.
- Manual Básico de Lucha contra Incendios Forestales [Wildfire Fighting Handbook] (in Spanish) (3rd ed.). Tenerife, Spain: Ediciones Singularidad. 2025. ISBN 978-8412921588.
