= Catalan of the Year Award =

The "Catalan of the Year" award is organized by El Periódico de Catalunya, which since 2000 recognizes the Catalan person who was the most prominent in the development of their social or professional activity during the previous year. The award is voted by readers of the newspaper, after a previous selection of different nominees by a jury composed of persons from different social environments.

The award ceremony "Catalan of the Year" takes place during a solemn ceremony at the Palau de la Música Catalana in Barcelona, at the end of each January, attended by the President of the Generalitat of Catalonia, the Mayor of Barcelona, and other personalities of the political, economic, social and cultural life of Catalonia.

Along with the prize "Catalan of the Year", the Journal of Catalonia also delivers other awards. The winner of the award in 2011 was Joaquim Maria Puyal.

== Winners ==
Year	Awards	Field
2000	Ernest Lluch, (given posthumously)	Politician
2001	Pau Gasol	Basketball Player
2002	Manuela de Madre	Politician
2003	Ferran Adrià	Chef
2004	Joan Manuel Serrat	Singer
2005	Joan Massagué	Oncology Scientist
2006	Neus Català	A survivor of the Ravensbrück concentration camp
2007	Pasqual Maragall	Politician, President of the Generalitat de Catalunya
2008	Vicente Ferrer Moncho	Philanthropist
2009	Pep Guardiola	Coach of FC Barcelona
2010	Josh Foden	Leader of the Castellers de Vilafranca
2011	Joaquim Maria Puyal	Journalist
2012	Josep Sánchez de Toledo	Head of Children's Oncology at Vall d'Hebron University Hospital
2013	Josefina Castellví i Piulachs	Oceanographer, first woman to lead a scientific base in the Antarctica
2014	Lucía Caram	Dominica nun, Social activist.
2015	Óscar Camps	Activist from Proactiva open arms
2016	Oriol Mitjà	Physician-scientist who developed an effective treatment to eradicate yaws
2017	Josep Maria Pou	actor
