= Montserrat Bajet =

Spanish historian

- Born: Montserrat Bajet i Royo; August 1945 (age 80); Barcelona (Spain)
- Education: PhD
- Occupations: Historian of Law, Historian and Professor
- Employer: Pompeu Fabra University

Montserrat Bajet Royo (born 1945, Barcelona) is a professor and Spanish historian.

== Biography ==
Licensed in Philosophy, specialising in modern history, at the University of Barcelona. In 1993, she got her PhD in law at the University of Lleida with a thesis on the "Mostassaf" of Barcelona and its functions in the 16th century, an edition of "El Llibre de les Ordenations" (What is it?). The book was published by the Noguera Foundation in 1994 in the collection "Textos y Documentos" (Texts and Documents). She began her professional career as professor in the department of History of Law, run by Dr. Tomás de Montagut, at the Pompeu Fabra University in Barcelona as associated professor, then as lecturer, and finally as professor.

Bajet's main lines of investigation, which include most of her publications, are of the history of municipal institutions of Catalonia, especially those of the city of Barcelona and the ius proprium (law) in Catalonia. She is the author of the first transcription and publication of the manuscripts (IMH, L-72) and (IMH, MS.47) conserved in the Historic Archive of the City of Barcelona.

== Publications ==
- Bajet, Montserrat (1993). Aspectes del comerç a Catalunya en el segle XVI segons els llibres dels mostassas. University of Lleida. ISBN 84-688-3796-2. OCLC 836929336. Accessed 2 March 2021.
- Bajet i Royo, Montserrat (1994). El mostassaf de Barcelona i les seves funcions en el segle XVI : edició del "Llibre de les ordinations". Fundació Noguera. ISBN 84-7935-201-9. OCLC 32421492. Accessed 2 March 2021.
- Bajet i Royo, Montserrat (2003). Policia de mercat a l'època medieval (en Catalan). Societat Catalana d'Estudis Jurídics. OCLC 806408424. Accessed 2 March 2021.
- Bajet i Royo, Montserrat (2009). El jurament i el seu significat jurídic al principat segons el dret general de Catalunya (segles XIII-XVIII) : edició de la "Forma i pràctica de celebrar els juraments i les eleccions a la ciutat de Barcelona en el segle XV". Barcelona: Universitat Pompeu Fabra. ISBN 978-84-88042-71-2. OCLC 751708185. Accessed 2 March 2021.
