= Las Ramblas (disambiguation) =

Las Ramblas may refer to:

- La Rambla, Barcelona (often called Las Ramblas), an iconic and busy street in central Barcelona
- Las Ramblas Resort, a canceled mixed-use project that was to be constructed in Paradise, Nevada, U.S.
- Campo de Golf Las Ramblas, a golf course in Villamartin, Valencian Community of Spain

== See also ==
- La Rambla (disambiguation)
