= Mitja (given name) =

Mitja is a primarily masculine given name. Notable bearers include:

- Mitja Borkert (born 1974), German automobile designer
- Mitja Brodar (1921–2012), Slovene paleontologist
- Mitja Brulc (born 1979), Slovene footballer
- Mitja Dragšič (born 1979), Slovene alpine skier
- Mitja Drinovec (born 1996), Slovene biathlete
- Mitja Ferenc (born 1960), Slovene historian
- Mitja Gaspari (born 1951), Slovenian economist and politician
- Mitja Gasparini (born 1984), Slovene volleyball player
- Mitja Ilenič (born 2004), Slovene footballer
- Mitja Janc (born 2003), Slovene handball player
- Mitja Kosmina (born 1966), Slovene sailor
- Mitja Kosovelj (born 1984), Slovene mountain runner
- Mitja Kovačević (born 1991), Slovene footballer
- Mitja Krevs (born 1989), Slovene middle-distance runner
- Mitja Kunc (born 1971), Slovene alpine skier
- Mitja Leskovar (born 1970), Slovene apostolic nuncio
- Mitja Lotrič (born 1994), Slovene footballer
- Mitja Mahorič (born 1976), Slovene cyclist
- Mitja Margon (born 1971), Slovene sailor
- Mitja Mežnar (born 1988), Slovene ski jumper
- Mitja Mörec (born 1983), Slovene footballer
- Mitja Nevečny (born 1983), Slovene sailor
- Mitja Nikisch (1899–1936) German classical pianist
- Mitja Nikolić (born 1991), Slovene basketball player
- Mitja Oranič (born 1986), Slovene skier
- Mitja Okorn (born 1981), Slovene film director
- Mitja Petkovšek (born 1977), Slovene artistic gymnast
- Mitja Ribičič (1919–2013), Slovene politician
- Mitja Robar (born 1983), Slovene ice hockey player
- Mitja Saje (born 1947), Slovene sinologist
- Mitja Schäfer (born 1980), German footballer
- Mitja Šivic (born 1979), Slovene ice hockey player
- Mitja Valenčič (born 1978), Slovene alpine skier
- Mitja Velikonja (born 1965), Slovene cultural studies academic
- Mitja Viler (born 1986), Slovene footballer
- Mitja Zastrow (born 1977), Dutch swimmer
- Mitja Zatkovič (born 1983), Slovene footballer
