= Wang Huiqin =

Chinese-Slovenian artist, painter, calligrapher, book illustrator and author

Wang Huiqin 王惠琴
- Born: 21 October 1955 (age 71); Nantong, China
- Education: painting, chinese calligraphy
- Known for: visual art and illustrating
- Awards: Levstik Award; 1993 Brokatna podoba Kristina Brenk Award; 2014 Ferdinand Augustin Hallerstein: Slovenian in the Forbidden City

Wang Huiqin (Chinese: 王惠琴; pinyin: Wāng Huìqín; born 21 October 1955) is a Chinese-Slovenian artist: painter, calligrapher, book illustrator and author.

Wang Huiqin was born in Nantong, China in 1955. She graduated from the department of fine arts at the Nanjing Faculty of Education. In 1983, Wang came to Slovenia where she specialized in graphic arts and painting at the Academy of Fine Arts in Ljubljana. She lives and works in Ljubljana. Her creative medium is visual art and also writing. She collaborates with the Department for Asian and African Studies and with the Arts Faculty of the University of Ljubljana where she teaches calligraphy and Chinese art. In 2000, she became senior university assistant professor for drawing and calligraphy.

In 2005, Slovenian Times chose her for the cultural personality of the year. She represented Slovenian artists at the entry of Slovenia into the European Union and exhibited in Portugal, Italy, Belgium, Austria, Germany, Slovenia, and China. She has illustrated and also written a number of children's books for Slovene publishers.

In 2008 she has started Ferdinand Avguštin Hallerstein, a big project with a lot of different events, exhibitions and an illustrated book.

Her husband is Slovenian sinologist Mitja Saje.

Illustrations and books:

- Jack London: Klic divjine (The Call of the Wild, ČZP Kmečki glas, Ljubljana 1986)
- Brokatna podoba, Pravljice kitajskih manjšin (Brocade Image, Tales of Chinese Ethnic Minorities, Mladinska knjiga, Ljubljana 1991) received the Levstik Award for her illustrations of traditional stories
- Alenka Auersperger: Kitajski zapiski (Chinese Notes, Dolenjska založba, Novo mesto 1994)
- Pripovedke s strehe sveta, Tibetanske pripovedke (Tales from the Roof of the World, Tibetan Tales, Mladinska kniga, Ljubljana 1995)
- Najlepša pahljača, Japonske pravljice (The Most Beautiful Fan, Japanese Fairy Tales, Mladinska knjiga, Ljubljana 1996)
- Franci Koncilija: Zasledovani spomini (Pursued Memories, Dolenjska založba, Novo mesto 1998)
- Kaligrafija kot umetnost (Calligraphy As an Art, scripta, Beletrina 2010)
- Huiqin Wang: Ferdinand Avguštin Hallerstein: Slovenec v Prepovedanem mestu. (Ferdinand Augustin Hallerstein: Slovenian in the Forbidden City; Ljubljana: Mladinska knjiga 2014, 31pp) received the Kristina Brenk Award for the best original Slovene picture book in 2014 and the Golden Pear Award for the best children non-fiction book in 2015.
- Huiqin Wang: Giuseppe Castiglione: slikar v Prepovedanem mestu. (Giuseppe Castiglione: painter in the Forbidden City; Jezero: Morfemplus 2015, 31pp)
- Huiqin Wang: Jaz, Marco Polo. (Me Marco Polo; Ljubljana: Mladinska knjiga 2018, 31pp)

Selected individual exhibitions

- Šivec House Art Gallery, Radovljica, Slovenia 1984
- Niš Municipal gallery, Niš, Yugoslavia 1986
- Jiangsu Province Art Gallery, Nanjing, China 1992
- Dolenjska Muzeum, Novo mesto, Slovenia 1993
- The Clash of East and West, The ZDSLU Gallery, Ljubljana, Slovenia 1993
- The XXOY Gallery, Bruseels, Belgium 1995
- The TR3 Gallery, Ljubljana, Slovenia 1997
- Scrolls 1990–1997, Domžale Art Gallery, Slovenia 1997
- Loža Gallery, Koper, Slovenia 1998
- We are Ephemeral – Sonhos Efemeros(with Živko Marušič), Palacio Foz Lisbon, Portugal 1999
- Beyond Dreams (with Tomaž Lunder), Nanjing Shenhua Art Centre, China 2004
- Impalpable Beings, Cankarjev dom, Ljubljana, Slovenia 2006
- Insieme – Skupaj (together with Zora Stančič), A+A gallery, Venice, Italy 2006
- Live Calligraphy (with Daisuke Sakaki), Kibla, Maribor, Slovenia 2007
- Transfer Beyond Time, Shanghai Archives, China 2008
- Transfer Beyond Time, Slovenian Ethnographic Museum, Ljubljana, Slovenia 2008
- Science Meets Art -Hallerstein, Ge Yi Gallery, Nantong, China 2009
- Intertwined path, Municipal Gallery Ljubljana, Slovenia 2010
- Everything is possible, The White Box Gallery, Beijing 798, China 2011
- May or May not (with Marko Mandič), Equrna Gallery, Ljubljana, Slovenia 2012
- Icons of Socialism (with z Metod Frlic), Alkatraz Gallery, Ljubljana, Slovenia 2013
- Hallerstein, Slovenian in Forbidden City, Slovenian Ethnographic Museum, Ljubljana, Slovenija, 2014
- Hallerstein and Silk Road, UNO, Wien, Austria, 2017

Selected awards:

- Levstik Award, 1993
- Hinko Smrekar Distinction, 1993
- Guest Star – Slovenia Times, 2005
- Kristina Brenk Award, 2014
- The Golden Pear Award, 2015
