= Coslada Central (Madrid Metro) =

Madrid Metro station

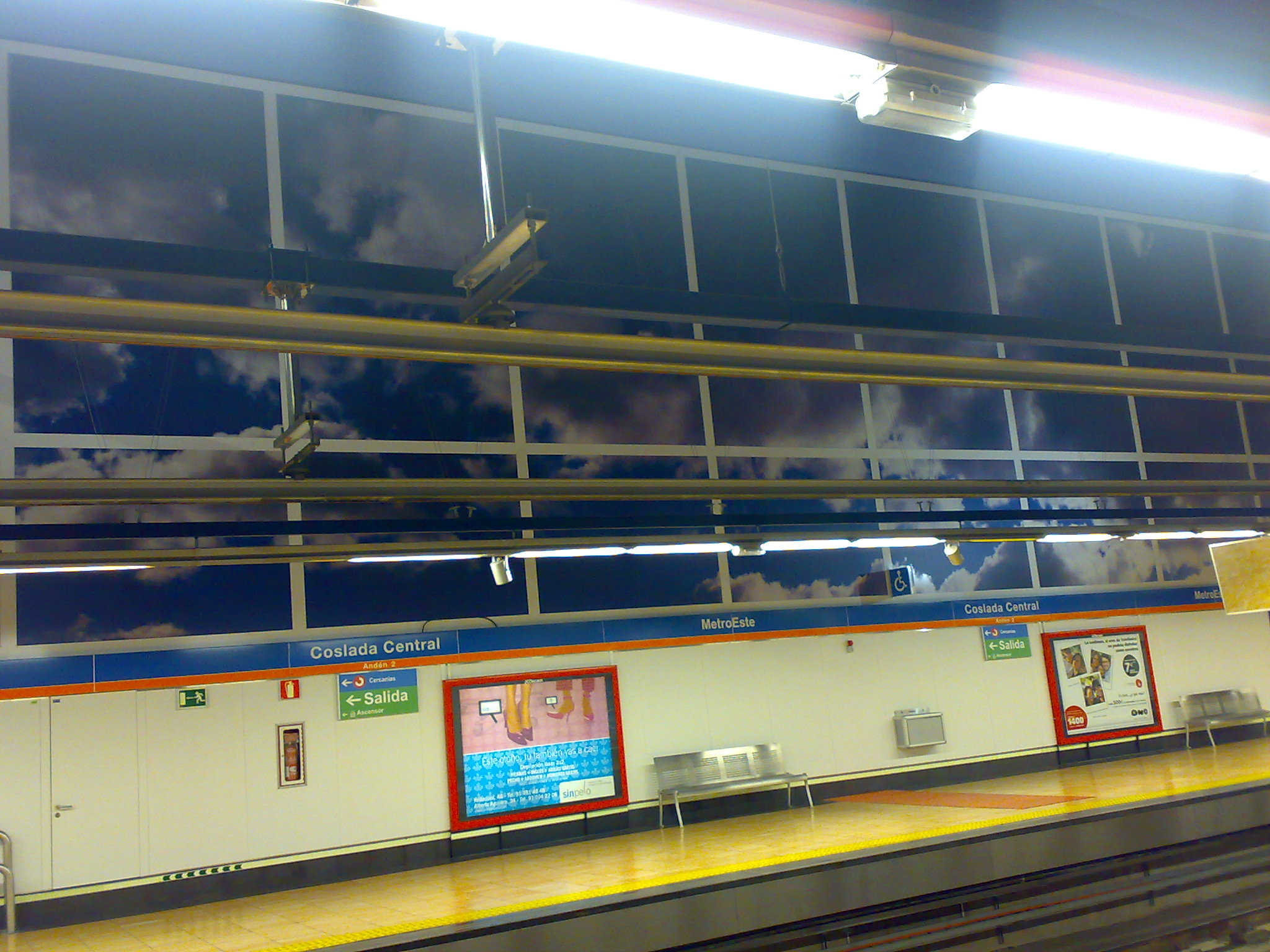

General information
- Location: 1st district of Coslada, Madrid; Spain
- Coordinates: 40.4237329°N 3.5611868°W
- System: Madrid Metro station
- Owner: CRTM
- Operator: CRTM

Construction
- Accessible: yes

Other information
- Fare zone: B1

History
- Opened: 5 May 2007; 19 years ago

Services
Preceding station	Madrid Metro	Following station
La Rambla towards Hospital del Henares	Line 7	Barrio del Puerto towards Pitis
Out of system interchange
Preceding station	Cercanías Madrid	Following station
San Fernando towards Chamartín	C-2	Vicálvaro towards Guadalajara
San Fernando towards Príncipe Pío	C-7	Vicálvaro towards Alcalá de Henares
San Fernando towards Santa María de la Alameda or Cercedilla	C-8	Vicálvaro towards Guadalajara
Location
- Location within Madrid

Coslada Central ([kosˈlaða θenˈtɾal], "Central Coslada") is a station on Line 7 of the Madrid Metro. It is located in fare Zone B1. The station offers access to Cercanías Madrid via Coslada railway station.
