= La Rambla =

La Rambla can refer to:

- Hispanic term with similar meaning as Esplanade
- Arroyo (creek), a seasonally dry stream bed, rambla in Arabic

== Places ==
- La Rambla (Madrid Metro), a station on Line 7
- La Rambla, Barcelona, an iconic and busy street in central Barcelona
- La Rambla (climb), climbing route in Catalonia, Spain
- La Rambla, Córdoba, a municipality in Spain
- La Rambla, Montevideo, an avenue that goes all along the coastline of Montevideo, Uruguay
- La Rambla Building, a building in Carmel-by-the-Sea, California, US
