= San Fernando (Madrid Metro) =

Madrid Metro station

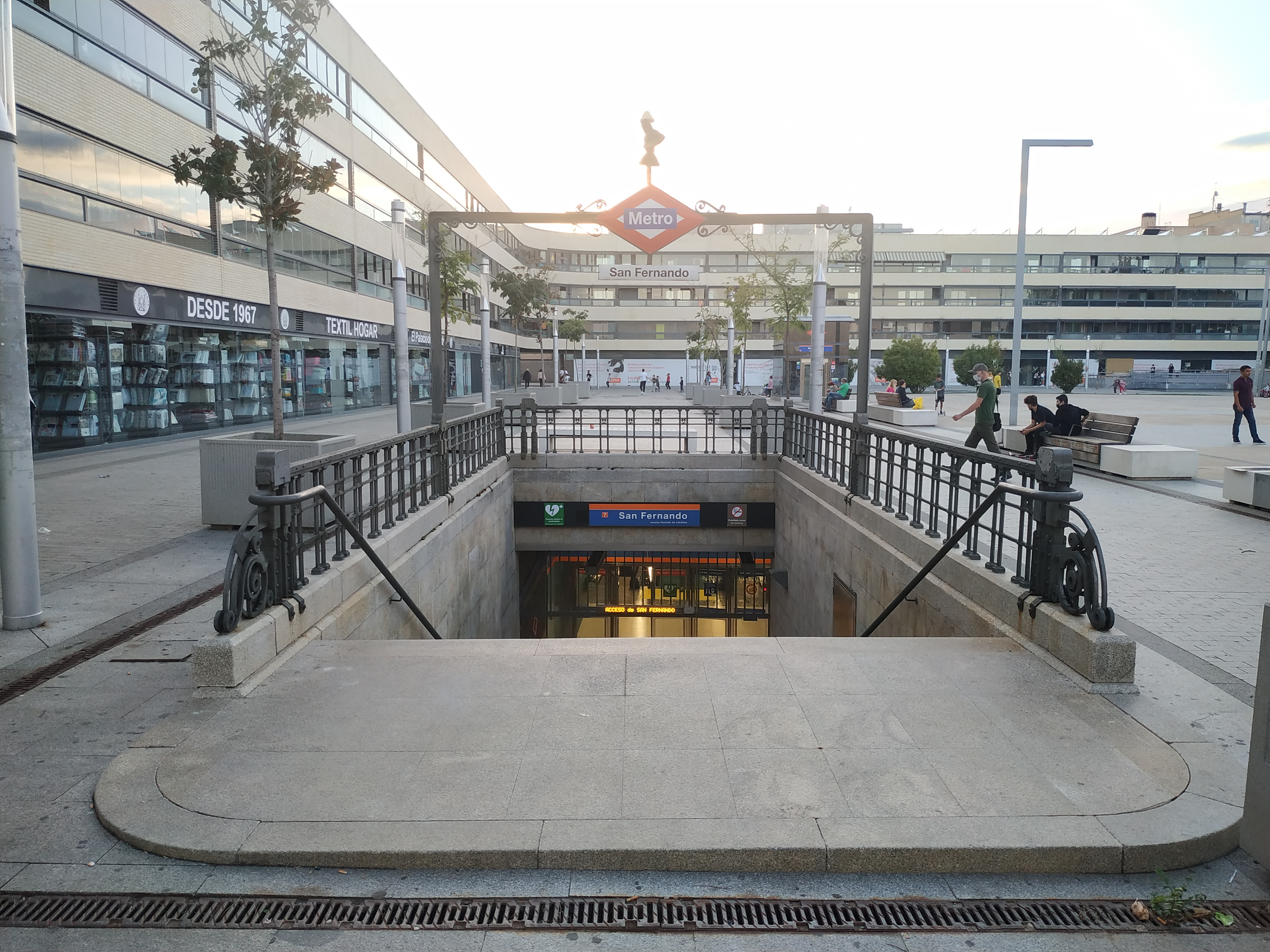

General information
- Location: San Fernando de Henares, Madrid; Spain
- Coordinates: 40.4244134°N 3.5354112°W
- System: Madrid Metro station
- Owner: CRTM
- Operator: CRTM

Construction
- Accessible: yes

Other information
- Fare zone: B1

History
- Opened: 5 May 2007; 19 years ago

Services
Preceding station	Madrid Metro	Following station
Jarama towards Hospital del Henares	Line 7	La Rambla towards Pitis
Location
- Location within Madrid

San Fernando [ˌsaɱ feɾˈnando] is a station on Line 7 of the Madrid Metro. It is located in the municipality of San Fernando de Henares and in fare Zone B1.
