= Rambla de Ferran-Estació =

Neighborhood in Lleida, Catalonia, Spain

Coordinates: 41°37′11.53″N 0°37′55.40″E

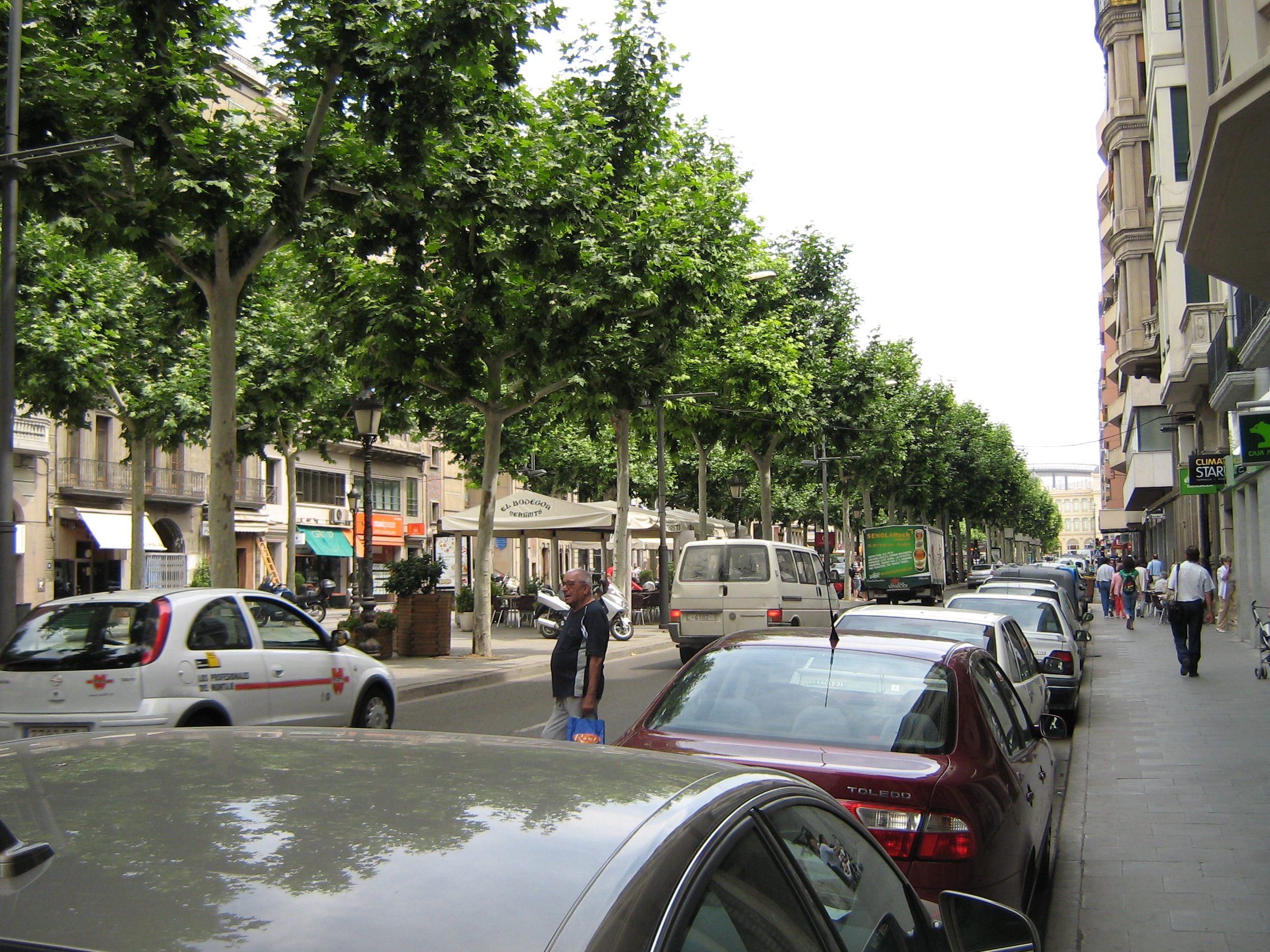
Rambla de Ferran avenue

Rambla de Ferran - Estació is a neighborhood in Lleida, Catalonia, Spain. As of 2009, it had 3,823 inhabitants. It is named after the Lleida Pirineus railway station located in the area, as well as for the Rambla de Ferran avenue. It is bordered (clockwise starting from the northeast) by the neighborhoods of Pardinyes, Cappont, Centre Històric and Príncep de Viana - Clot.

== See also ==
- Neighborhoods of Lleida
