= Lucía Caram =

Argentine nun (born 1966)

Sor Lucía Caram
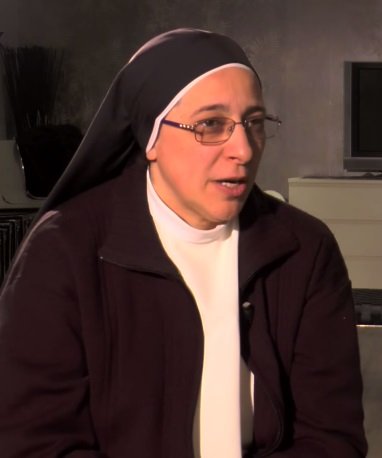
- Lucía Caram in 2015

Personal details
- Born: María Lucía Caram; 21 October 1966 (age 59) Tucumán, Argentina
- Denomination: Catholicism
- Residence: Manresa, Spain
- Profession: Religious Sister

Sor Lucía Caram Padilla (born 21 October 1966) is a Dominican Order nun, chef, writer, and presenter. She is Argentine, and currently resides in Spain.

== Biography ==
Lucía Caram was born in Tucumán, the fifth of seven siblings, to a family of Lebanese descent. She was educated at a religious school.

During the dictatorship in Argentina from 1976 to 1983, Tucumán was punished by military repression, and she says that "it was then when [she] encountered people's suffering and the question of why there is violence. That was the first seed of [her] vocation."

Lucía Caram has lived in Spain for 27 years and resides in the Convent of Santa Clara de Manresa in Barcelona, where she promotes interreligious dialogue. She is the promoter of the Fundación Rosa Oriol, which serves 1,400 disadvantaged families.

She sparked outrage and received death threats after suggesting that Mary, mother of Jesus may not have been a virgin.

In March 2022, Caram, O.P. drove 3,725 miles in a minibus over 4 days from her Convent of Santa Clara de Manresa in Barcelona, to Romania’s northern border with Ukraine to give assistance to refugees arriving from the country under attack. She helped 6 refugees (3 women and 3 adolescents) and 3 Ukrainian families. ‘I spent some restless nights wondering how I might help’ lamented the nun who is caring for a mother and child from Ukraine with the help of 17 lay volunteer couples.

In March 2023, Carams brought humanitarian aid and returned home with refugees or wounded soldiers. “Now after 18 trips, I see that Ukraine has lost one or two generations. You go to the cemetery, and you see the graves multiply every time. I am struck by this,” she said. In her 24 May 2023 visit to Pope Francis she discussed about her project to provide field hospitals to Ukraine.

On 13 March 2024, Caram and Religión Digital met Pope Francis at the Paul VI Hall, (la auletta) who advised:“Do not lose hope. Continue fighting for this living Church and making it known.”

On 28 August 2025, Caram met with Pope Leo XIV in a private audience. Details of the meeting are unknown, and the audience only came to light because photographs were released showing that it happened.

== Television ==
She collaborates on the program Las mañanas de Cuatro. She also has a recipe show on the Spanish Cooking Channel, Sor Lucía. This program is also broadcast for Latin America by El Gourmet.

== Awards and recognitions ==
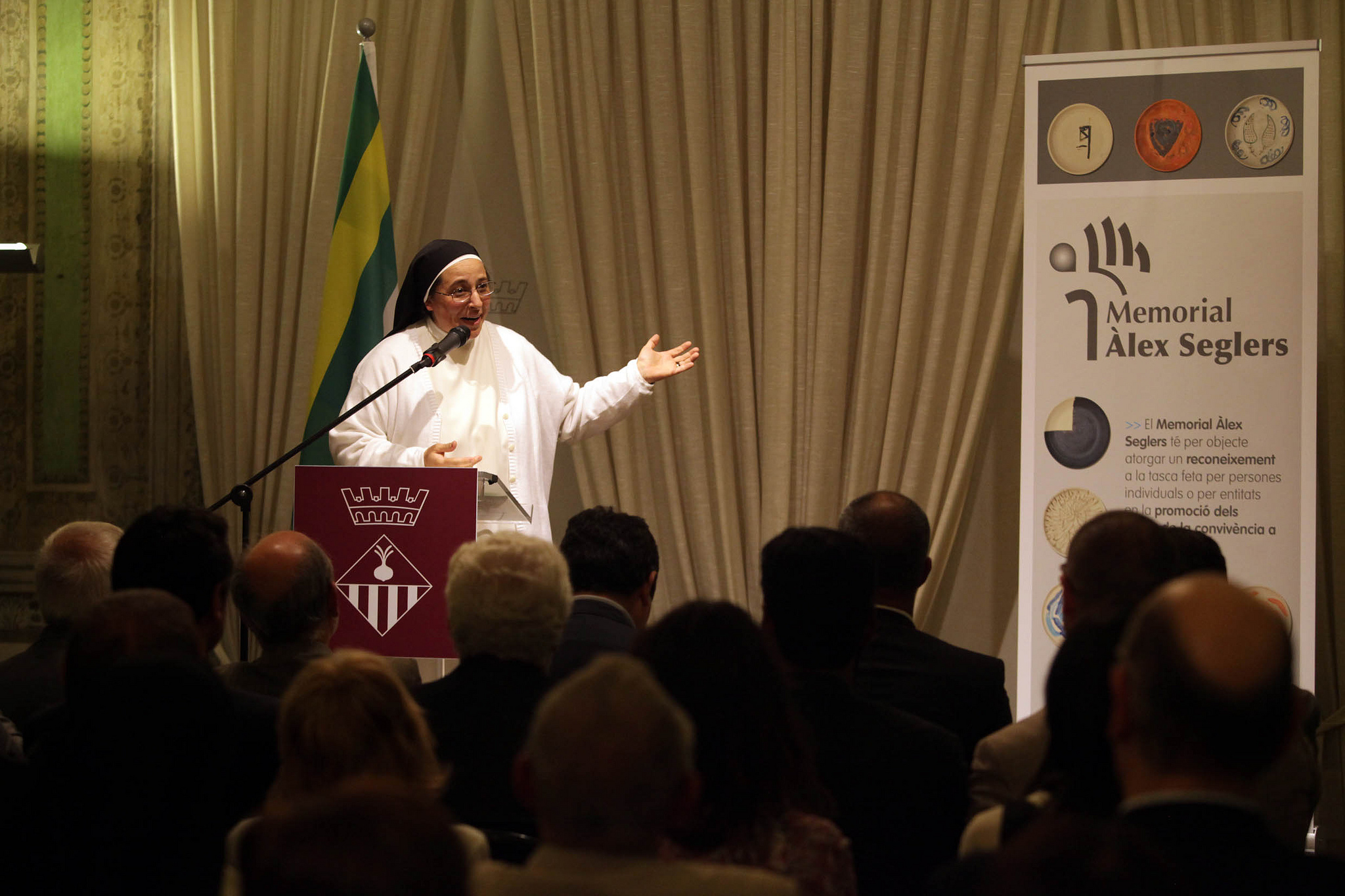
Sor Lucía Caram on the podium, receiving the Àlex Seglers Memorial Prize

In 2006, she received the Àlex Seglers Memorial Prize in recognition of her activity in ecumenism, such as the creation of the Interreligious Dialogue Group in Manresa and her participation in the Second Catalan Parliament's Committee on Religions in 2006.

In 2015, she was given the Catalan of the Year Award, a prize that is granted by a vote from the readers of El Periódico de Cataluña and the viewers of the TV3 program Els matins.

== Books ==
- 1995, Vive tu fe ¡El Catecismo en crucigramas! (ISBN 978-84-85803-59-0)
- 1997, El Evangelio en crucigramas (ISBN 978-84-89761-79-7)
- 2000, Nueva oración de los fieles I (ISBN 978-84-8407-096-2)
- 2000, Nueva oración de los fieles II (ISBN 978-84-8407-097-9)
- 2012, Mi claustro es el mundo
- 2014, Estimar la vida (ISBN 978-84-16154104)
- 2014, A Dios rogando (ISBN 978-84-15880-82-0)
- 2014, Amar la vida y compartirla
- 2015, Sor Lucía se confiesa (ISBN 978-84-16256-78-5)
- 2015, Las recetas de Sor Lucía Caram (ISBN 9788416245000)
