= Rosa Serra =

Spanish sculptor (born 1944)

Rosa Serra i Puigvert (born 1944, in Vic) is a Spanish sculptor, best known for being commissioned by the International Olympic Committee to make a series of sculptures for the 1988 Summer Olympics, the 1992 Summer Olympics, for their Committee's headquarters in Lausanne, and for the Olympic Council of Asia headquarters in Kuwait City. In 2008, she was awarded a Creu de Sant Jordi by the Generalitat de Catalunya.
