= Rambla d'Aragó, Lleida =

Street in Lleida, Spain

Coordinates: 41°36′50″N 0°37′12″E

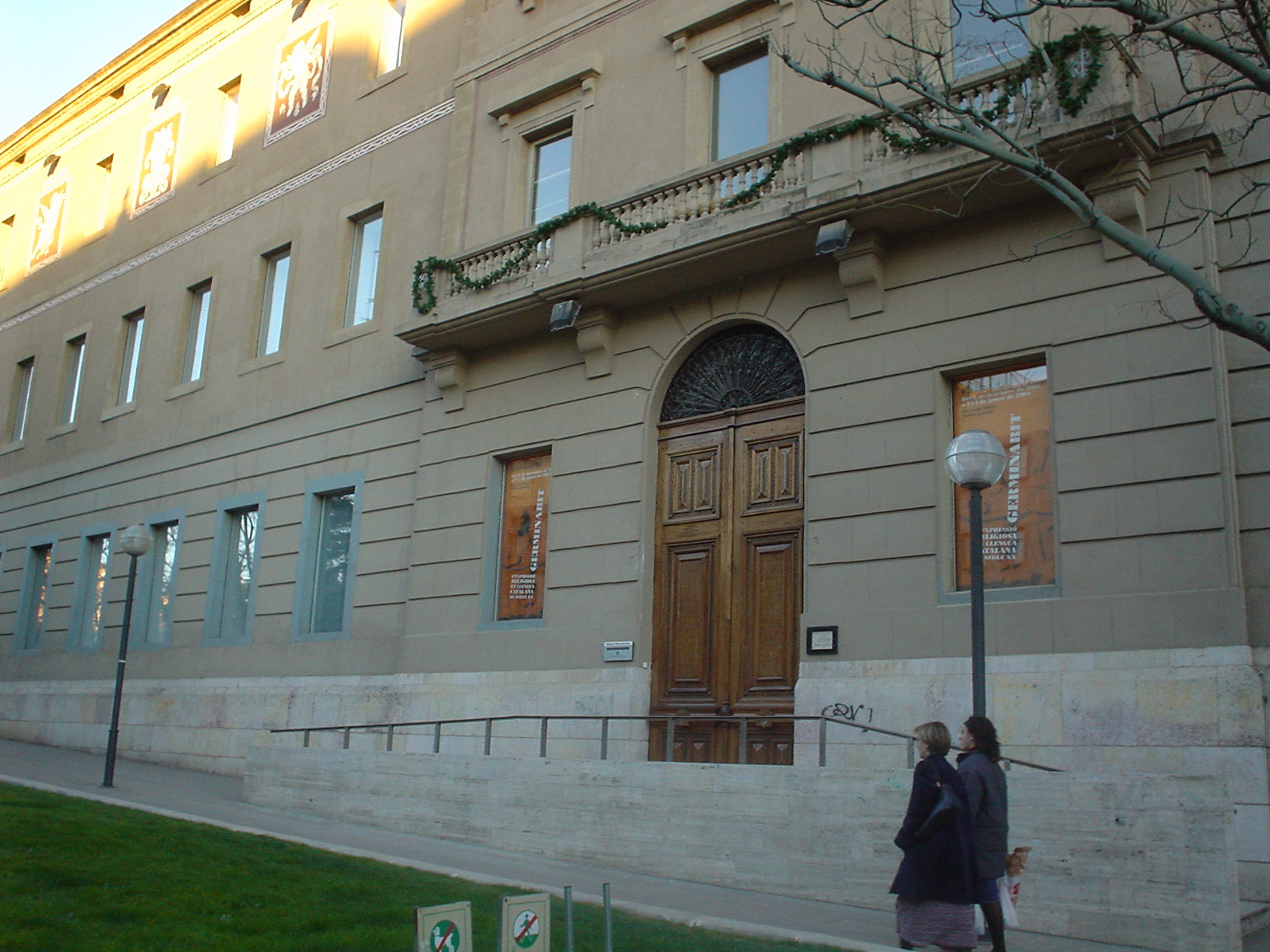
Biblioteca Pública de Lleida

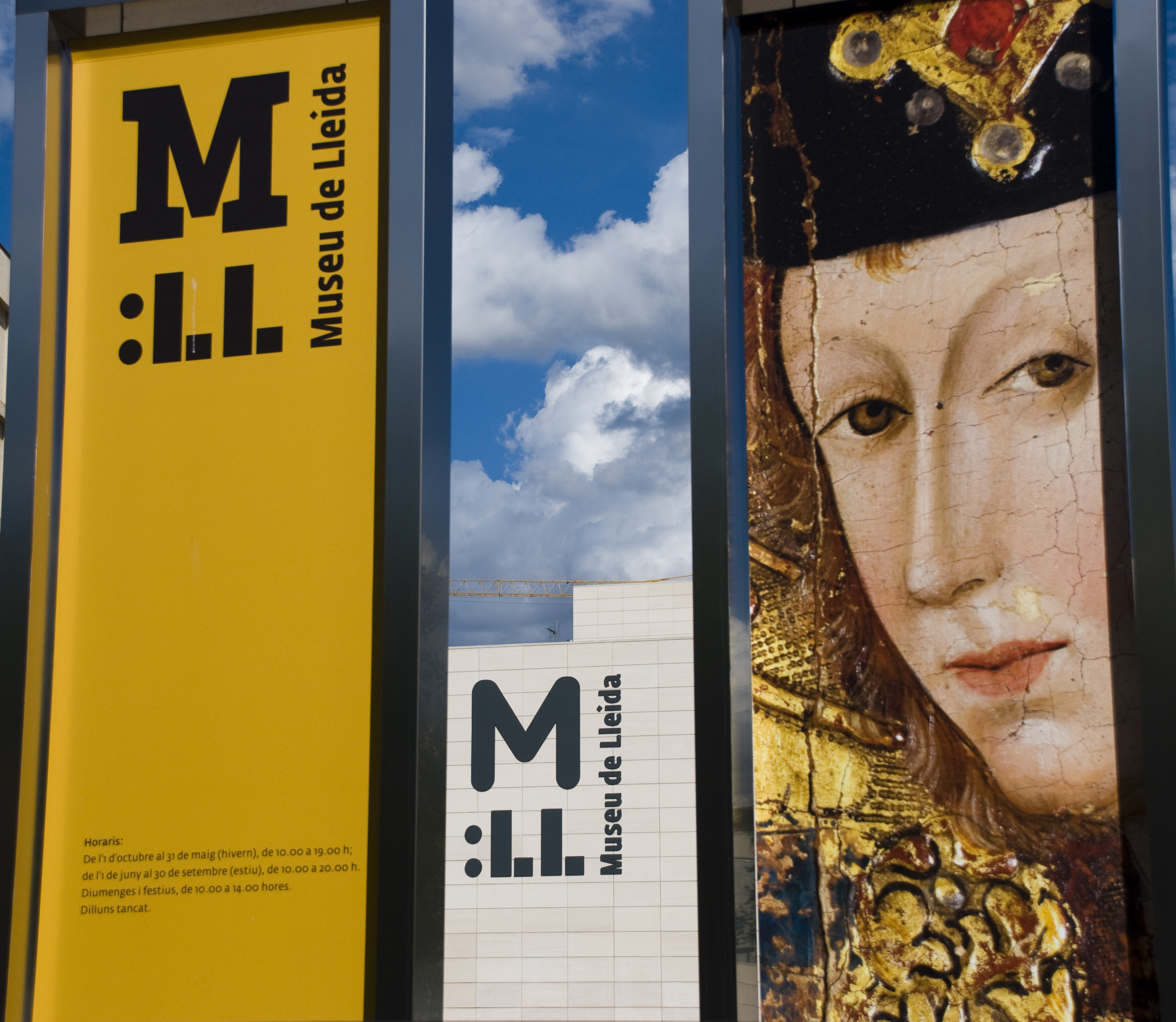
Museu de Lleida

Rambla d'Aragó (Catalan pronunciation: [ˈramblə ðəɾəˈɣo]) is an important thoroughfare in the Universitat district of Lleida, Catalonia, Spain. Originally a rambla with a pedestrianised area complete with a marketplace and a service of trams, it underwent several changes and is now a regular street crossed by cars. It originates at Plaça de Cervantes and ends in Avinguda Catalunya. It hosts the former Maternity home, now Lleida Public Library, the art-nouveau buildings Cases Balasch, the Lleida Bishopric Palace, the Museu de Lleida Diocesà i Comarcal, as well as the main University of Lleida campus, built in 19th-century neo-Gothic style.

== Transport ==
- Autobusos de Lleida L1 (Interior), L5 (Bordeta), L6 (Magraners), L7 (Secà), L11 (Butsènit-Llívia), L12 (Centre Històric-Universitat), L13 (Cappont) and L14 (Agrònoms).

== See also ==
- Rambla Ferran
- University of Lleida
- Museu de Lleida Diocesà i Comarcal
- List of streets and squares in Lleida
