= Mitja Saje =

Slovenian sinologist

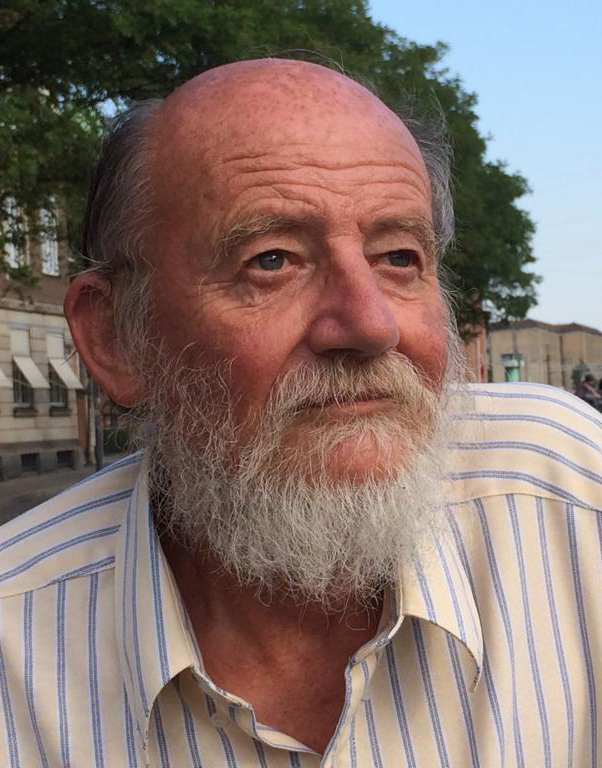
Mitja Saje

Mitja Saje (Chinese: 萨米加) (born 16 August 1947) is a Slovenian sinologist.

== Biography ==
Mitja Saje was born in Ljubljana. He studied at both Faculty of Economics and Faculty of Arts of the University of Ljubljana. As a student in the time of former nonaligned Yugoslavia he visited most of European countries, the United States, and North Africa. Then together with Andrej Bekeš in winter 1969–1970, with a basic knowledge of Japanese, he travelled to Japan via the Middle East and India and back to Europe through the USSR. In 1971 the two of them travelled to East Africa and started to learn Chinese. In 1972, he graduated at the Faculty of Economics. After graduation, he was employed as consultant for economic development at the Executive council of the Socialist Republic Slovenia. In 1976 he got a postgraduate scholarship to study in China, where he obtained a Master's degree in History of China at Nanjing University. After the return from China he started to conduct a Chinese language course at the Faculty of Arts in Ljubljana. There he received his PhD in 1994 for a thesis discussing the Chinese economy during the Ming dynasty.
He lives and works in Ljubljana. He is married to the painter Wang Huiqin.

=== Academic career ===
In his research he mostly examines subjects related to Chinese economy, Chinese politics, Chinese history and Chinese language. Since 1995, he has been a professor at the Chair of Sinology, Department of Asian and African Studies at the Faculty of Arts of the University of Ljubljana. He was one of the co-founders of this department and chaired it for four years (1995–1998). He retired in 2015 though he still lectures the subjects of Chinese history and Chinese economics. In 2016 got the title Professor Emeritus for his contribution to the development of sinology and Asian studies in Slovenia. Since 2006 he is also teaching Chinese history at the Faculty of Humanities and Social Sciences of the University of Zagreb in Croatia.
He is a member of the European Association for Chinese Studies (EACS). He was one of the hosts of the 'XVI. Biennial Conference of the EACS', which was held in Ljubljana in 2006.
Between 2008 and 2009 he collaborated in the EU-China cultural project on Hallerstein. During this project he hold presentations on Hallerstein's work and his importance for early cultural relations between Europe and China on symposiums in Slovenia, Austria, Czech Republic, Portugal, and China. At the conclusion of this project he edited a monograph on Hallerstein titled Hallerstein –Liu Songling: The Multicultural Legacy of Jesuit Wisdom and Piety at the Qing dynasty Court, which was published in China in Chinese translation in 2014.
After the World Financial Crises in 2009 he is analysing Chinese integration into the global economy and the economic problems of the globalised world order.

== Publications ==
- 'Hallerstein –Liu Songling: The Multicultural Legacy of Jesuit Wisdom and Piety at the Qing Dynasty Court?', 2009 ISBN 9789616304269 and 2015 in Chinese language;
- 'History of China' (original in Slovene: Zgodovina Kitajske), Slovenska matica, 2015, ISBN 978-961-213-255-2;
- 'Veličina tradicionalne Kitajske - Zgodovina Kitajske od dinastije Qin do Song', Znanstvena založba Filozofske fakultete, Ljubljana 2009 ISBN/EAN: 78961237300,
- extended reprint 2017, ISBN 978-961-237-926-1;
- 'History of China: The Last Dynasty and the Challenges of Contemporary Times - From the Invasion of Manchus to the Proclamation of the People's Republic' (original in Slovene: 'Zadnja dinastija in izzivi sodobnosti - zgodovina Kitajske - Od vdora Mandžurcev do ustanovitve ljudske republike'), ISBN 961-237-104-0, first published in 2004,
- extended second edition 2018, ISBN 978-961-06-0007-7 COBISS 216481024;
- 'History of China: Ancient China - From the Dawn of Civilization to Qin Dynasty' (original in Slovene: 'Starodavna Kitajska - zgodovina Kitajske - Od najstarejših časov do dinastije Qin'), ISBN 961-237-018-4, first published in 2002;
- reprint 2010, ISBN 978-961-237-018-3;
- 'History of China: The Qing Dynasty - From Traditional Order to the Modern Times' (original in Slovene: 'Obdobje Qing - zgodovina Kitajske - Od tradicionalne do moderne dobe'), ISBN 86-7347-058-7, first published in 1994;
- 'History of China: Yuan and Ming Dynasties - Foreign Conquerors and Traditional Order' (original in Slovene: 'Obdobje Yuan in Ming - zgodovina Kitajske - Tuji osvajalci in trdnost tradicionalne ureditve'), ISBN 86-7207-099-2, first published in 1997,
- expended second edition, Znanstvena založba Filozofske fakultete Ljubljana 2014, ISBN 978-961-237-667-3;
- 'Chinese-Slovene Dictionary' (original in Slovene: 'Kitajsko-slovenski slovar'), first published in 1990 OCLC 441628898, COBISS 21892096.
