= Lleida Museum =

Museum in Lleida, Catalonia, Spain

Coordinates: 41°36′50″N 0°37′17″E

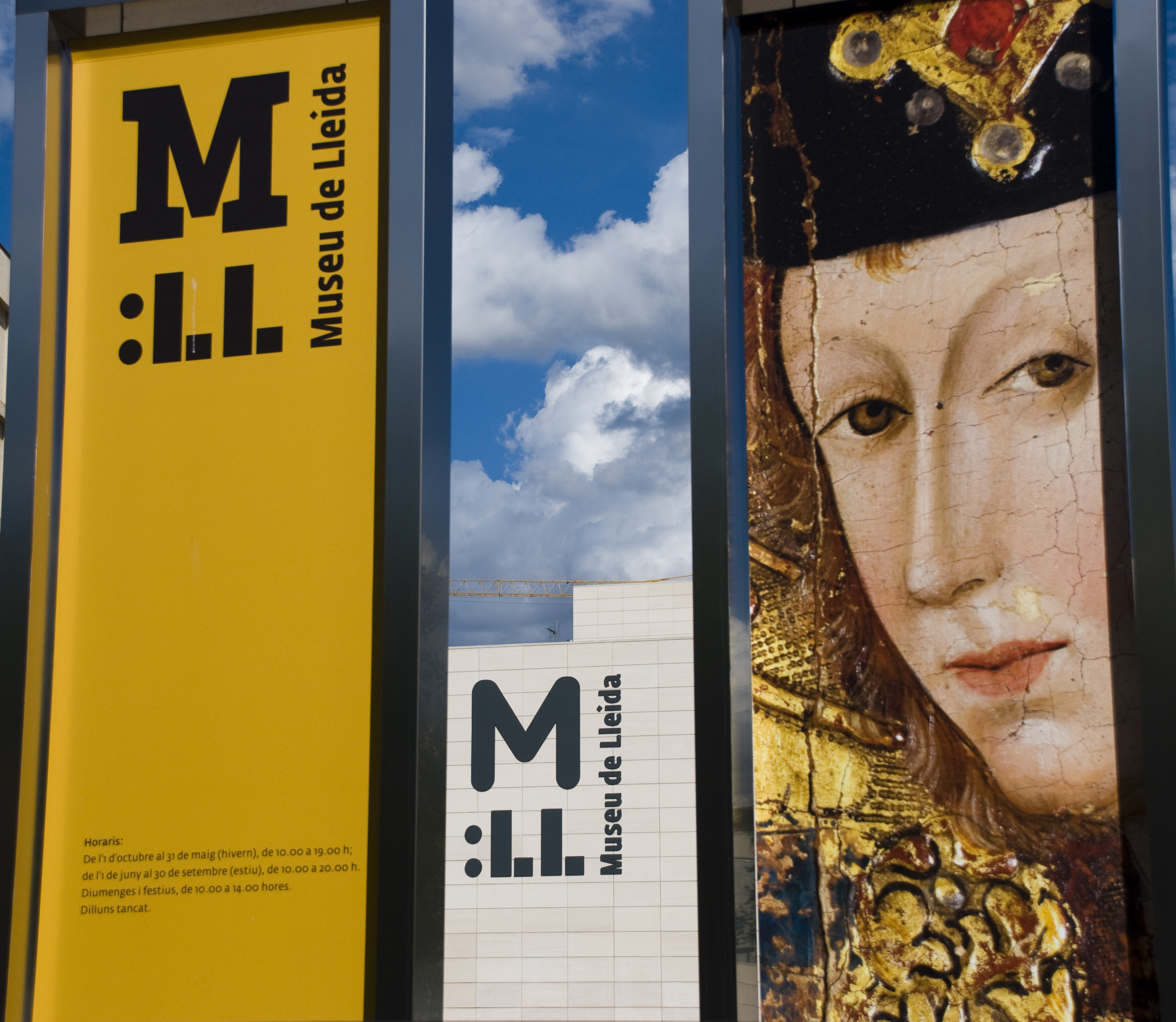
Sign at the entrance to the museum.

Lleida Museum, officially the Diocesan and Comarcal Lleida Museum (Catalan: Museu de Lleida, Museu Diocesà i Comarcal de Lleida), is an art and history museum located in Lleida, Catalonia, Spain.

It is owned by the Generalitat de Catalunya, the Lleida city council, Roman Catholic Diocese of Lleida and the comarcal council of Segrià, of which Lleida is the capital. The museum was established in 1997, while the current building in Rambla d'Aragó was inaugurated in 2007. It assembles a variety of collections, including Roman, Islamic, Romanesque, Gothic, Renaissance and Baroque art. The museum was controversial from its onset: some of the pieces on display were found in the Catalan-speaking part of Aragon known as Franja de Ponent, adjacent to Lleida and previously belonging to its local diocese, which however were segregated by Vatican decree in 1995, and now belongs to the neighbouring Roman Catholic Diocese of Barbastro-Monzón, a merger of former dioceses. They have been claimed by Aragonese institutions ever since.

== See also ==
- Culture in Lleida
- List of museums in Spain
- CaixaForum Lleida
- Institut d'Estudis Ilerdencs
