= La Rambla Building =

Historic building in California, U.S.

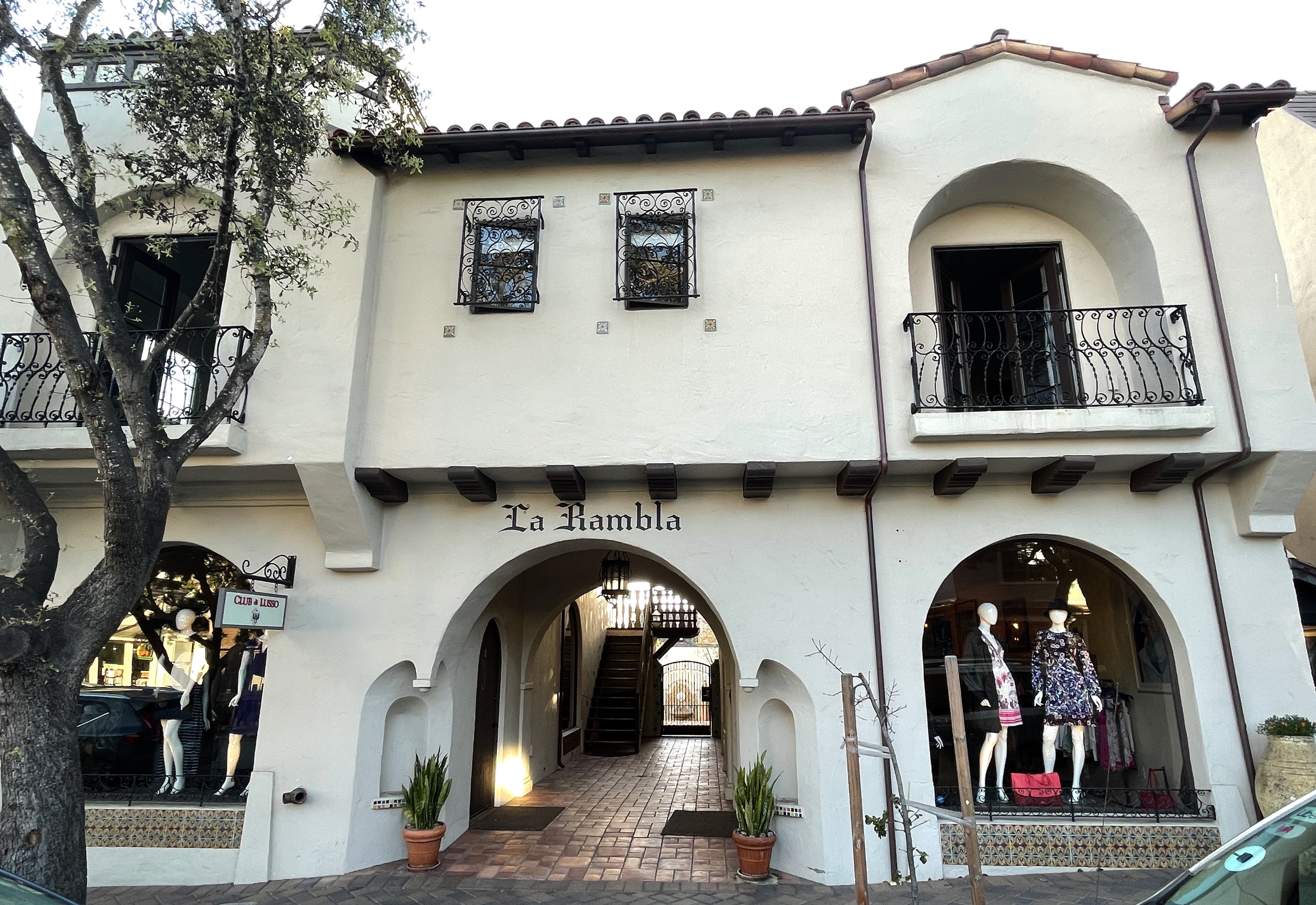
- La Rambla Building, Carmel-by-the-Sea, California

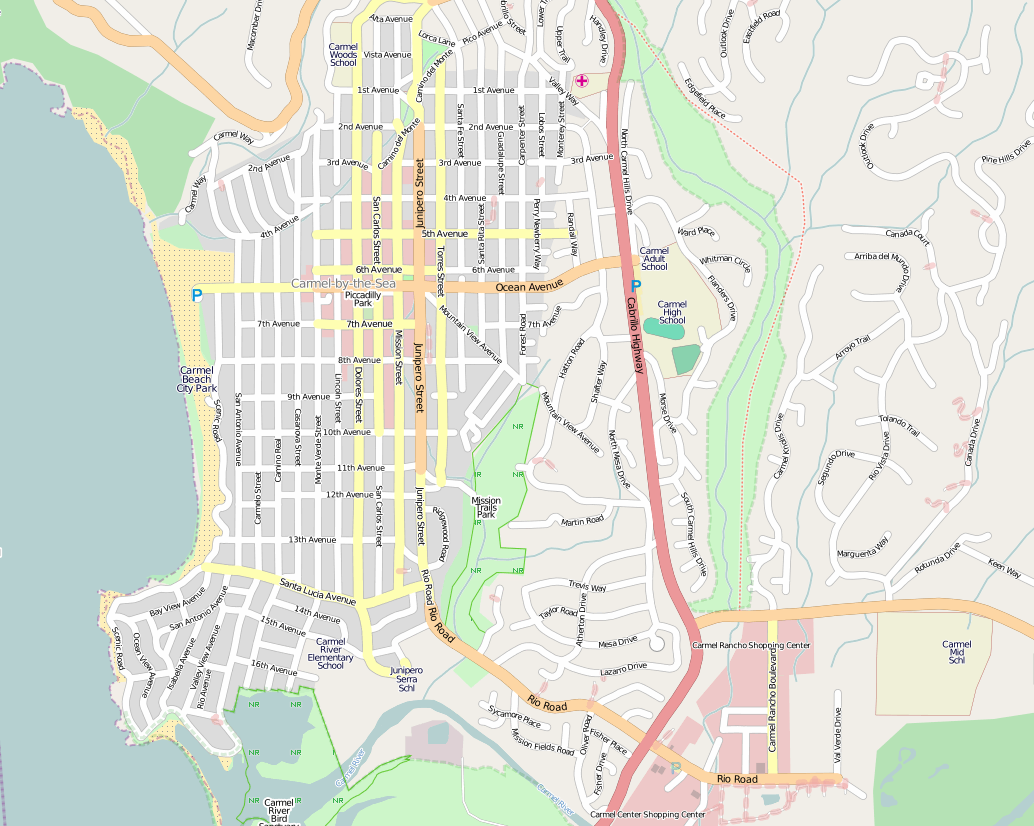
- Location in Carmel-by-the-Sea
- 36°33′16″N 121°55′24″W
- Location: Lincoln Street Carmel-by-the-Sea, California

History
- Built: 1929
- Built by: A. Carlyle Stoney
- Built for: Josephine Baber
- Original use: Frederick Rummelle's shop of Spanish and Mexican products

Site notes
- Architect: Guy O. Koepp
- Architectural style: Spanish Eclectic
- Current use: Retail

The La Rambla Building is a historic commercial building, built in 1929, in Carmel-by-the-Sea, California. The structure is recognized as an important Spanish Eclectic-style building in the city's Downtown Conservation District Historic Property Survey, and was nominated and submitted to the California Register of Historical Resources on January 30, 2003.

== History ==
The La Rambla Building is a two-story wood-framed Spanish Eclectic-style commercial building, which was constructed in 1929. The building was designed by architect Guy O. Koepp and built by Carlyle Stoney. It has shops on the ground floor and living quarters on the second floor. It has a central-arcade passageway on the first floor.

The passageway floor has flat ceramic tiles from Seville, Spain. The exterior walls are textured cement stucco. The ground floor has three large arched openings with two display windows at either side of the passageway. The upper floor overhangs the ground floor with wood brackets above the walkway and has two large recessed arched bays with French doors opening out onto balconies with wrought iron railings. Above the left balcony and window is a tower with low-pitched Spanish roof. Above the passageway is a flat tile roof and two small, wrought iron grilled windows, and an arched tile roof over the second balcony.

The La Rambla Building qualifies for inclusion in the city's Downtown Conservation District Historic Property Survey, and has been nominated and submitted to the California Register of Historical Resources on January 30, 2003, by Kent L. Seavey. The property is significant under the California Register criterion 3, in architecture, as it represents the commercial work of builder A. Carlyle Stoney, as one of three other remaining arcade passageway Spanish Eclectic-style buildings in Carmel. They include, Edward G. Kuster's Court of the Golden Bough (1923-1925), which includes Sade's (now Porta Bella’s with patio dining), Seven Arts Shop (now Body Frenzy) and the Carmel Weavers Studio (now Cottage of Sweets); the El Paseo Building (1928), and the Las Tiendas Building (1929). The buildings have a mid-block pedestrian passageway, from street to street, which was first introduced to Carmel in the mid 1920s.

The La Rambla property has been the home of several businesses over the years. The earliest retail business in 1929, was designer Frederick Rummelle's shop of Spanish and Mexican antiques and art. The lower courtyard was the home to an outdoor garden shop called Aslan's Garden. The original "Garden Shop" was created by Carmel artist Milton "Milt" Williams in 1958.

In January 2023, the La Rambla building was sold for $7.5 million to Patrice Pastor.

== Builder ==
The building was built by A. Carlyle Stoney. He and his four brothers were carpenters who worked for master builder M. J. Murphy before establishing their own contracting and building company. In 1932, Stoney built the Spanish Eclectic Reardon Building on Ocean Avenue and Mission Street, also known as the Carmel Dairy, for Thomas Reardon.

== See also ==
List of Historic Buildings in Carmel-by-the-Sea
