= Oriol Mitjà =

Catalan researcher

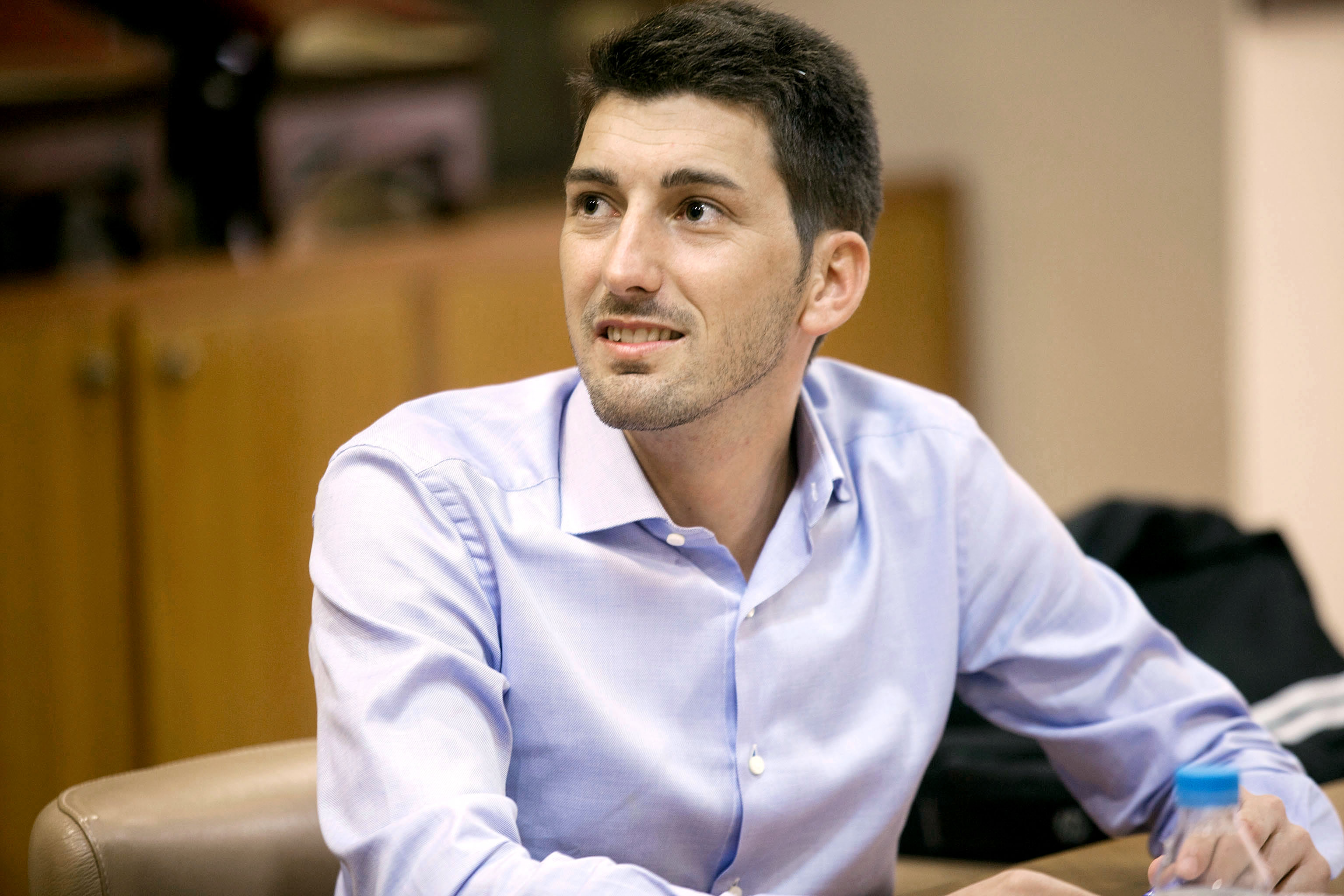
- Born: 1980 (age 45–46); Arenys de Munt
- Alma mater: University of Barcelona
- Occupation: Medical doctor, scientist
- Employer: Hospital Universitari Germans Trias i Pujol (2019–); Special Programme for Research and Training in Tropical Diseases (2012–); University of Papua New Guinea (2016–); Vall d'Hebron University Hospital (2005–2010)
- Awards: Prince of Girona award (2013); Catalan of the year Award (2016); Peace prize of the United Nations Association (2017); International Award Alfonso Comín (2017)

Oriol Mitjà i Villar (born 1980) is a Catalan researcher and consultant physician in internal medicine and infectious diseases with expertise in poverty-related tropical diseases. He has conducted research at the Lihir Medical Centre in Papua New Guinea since 2010 on new diagnostic and therapeutic tools to eradicate yaws. He was awarded the Princess of Girona Award in the scientific research category. Currently at the Germans Trias i Pujol Research Institute, Autonomous University of Barcelona, Mitjà is conducting research on SARS-CoV-2 coronavirus disease (COVID-19) and strategies to control the infection at a community level.

== Biography ==
Oriol Mitjà graduated in medicine from the University of Barcelona in 2004, after completing a residency in infectious diseases and a diploma in Hygiene and Tropical Medicine at the London School of Hygiene & Tropical Medicine. In 2012, he finished his Ph.D. in Medicine in Barcelona; his thesis was entitled "Strategies for the control of the yaws and other neglected tropical diseases of the South Pacific islands" and was based on his on-site research at the Lihir medical center in Papua New Guinea.

== Professional activity ==
=== Yaws eradication ===
After finishing his activity as a resident doctor, Mitjà focused on the development of diagnostic and therapeutic solutions to control and eradicate skin neglected tropical diseases, particularly yaws, which is a chronic and debilitating bacterial infection that affects the skin and bones.

Since 2010, he has collaborated with the Barcelona Institute of Global Health. He conducted a randomized trial that was published in 'The Lancet' that revealed that a single-dose oral azithromycin is effective to cure yaws and is easier and safer to administer as compared to the standard treatment with injectable penicillin. Accordingly, the World Health Organization (WHO) changed the treatment policies to recommend the use of azithromycin as the first-line treatment for yaws.

The previous yaws eradication campaign was launched in 1952 with estimated cases totaled 50 million worldwide. Twelve years later, prevalence had plunged by 95%. Governments and funding agencies soon lost interest and infection rates began climbing back up in the 1970s. The present WHO eradication strategy for yaws is mass treatment with single-dose oral azithromycin, followed by resurveys to find residual cases. Mitjà has demonstrated that the new strategy is effective in eliminating yaws from endemic countries and if implemented everywhere could result in yaws eradication, which was published in the New England Journal of Medicine.

=== Research on the new SARS-CoV-2 coronavirus ===
In 2018, Oriol Mitjà transferred his research lines to the Germans Trias i Pujol Research Institute. From 2020 to 2023, he worked to transfer his knowledge on epidemiology into clinical solutions for the SARS-CoV-2 pandemic. Mitjà conducted research to advance knowledge in the field of therapeutics, where he aimed at repurposing existing therapies to reduce the risk of infection with the SARS-CoV-2 coronavirus. In particular, he led a clinical trial that showed that post-exposure prophylaxis with hydroxychloroquine was not effective to prevent SARS-CoV-2, The results of this research were published in the New England Journal of Medicine. Additionally, Mitjà lead studies that showed that treatment based on and immunoglobulin anti-SARS-CoV-2, and of a treatment based on the transfusion of convalescent plasma, did not provide protection to people exposed to the virus.

Mitjà has repeatedly spoken in favor of intensifying the SARS-CoV-2 prevention and containment strategy and requested full lockdown in Spain during the month of March 2020. He has coordinated the drafting of an expert report commissioned by the Government of Catalonia that was delivered on April 21, 2020.

=== Research on mpox and syphilis ===
Since 2022, he has led studies on monkeypox (mpox), establishing an international network to describe its clinical manifestations and vaccine protection. He is currently working on the development of new treatments for syphilis in adults, congenital syphilis, and neurosyphilis, including clinical trials with linezolid as an alternative to penicillin.

== Prizes and distinctions ==
In 2012, Mitjà was awarded the Swiss Foundation Anne-Maurer Cecchini prize as a result of the publication of the aforementioned study re yaws in The Lancet

In 2013, he was awarded the Prince of Girona Foundation for Scientific Research for his "exemplary dedication in the field of endemic infectious diseases in developing countries and the great international impact of his work aimed at eradicating yaws disease of the planet".

In 2015, a documentary about his research project called "Where the Roads End" was produced by Noemí Cuní/David Fonseca.

In 2016, he received the Catalan of the Year Award and in 2017 received peace awards from the Association for United Nations in Spain and the International Award Alfonso Comín, in recognition of his work in favour of improving the living conditions of the people affected by the yaws.

In 2019, he was awarded a European Research Council Starting Grant to support research that aims to repurpose drugs to treat syphilis. In 2024, he was awarded a European Research Couoncil Consolidator Grant to support research on neurosyphilis and syphilis in pregnancy,

== Publications ==
- Mitjà, O; Hays, R; Ipai, A; et al. (2012-01-28). "Single-dose azithromycin versus benzathine benzylpenicillin for treatment of yaws in children in Papua New Guinea: an open-label, non-inferiority, randomised trial". Lancet. 379 (9813): 342–7. doi:10.1016/S0140-6736(11)61624-3. PMID 22240407. S2CID 17517869.
- Mitjà O; Houinei W; Moses P; at al. (2015). "Mass treatment with single-dose azithromycin for yaws". New England Journal of Medicine. 372 (8): 703–10. doi:10.1056/NEJMoa1408586. hdl:2445/68722. PMID 25693010.
- Mitjà O; Godornes C; Houinei W; at al. (2018). "Re-emergence of yaws after single mass azithromycin treatment followed by targeted treatment: a longitudinal study". The Lancet. 391 (10130): 1599–1607. doi:10.1016/S0140-6736(18)30204-6. PMC 5920722. PMID 29428183.
- Mitja, O; Marks, M; Konan, DPJ; et al. (2015). ""Global epidemiology of yaws " a systematic review". Lancet Global Health. 3 (6): e324–331. doi:10.1016/S2214-109X(15)00011-X. PMC 4696519. PMID 26001576.
- Mitja, O; Asiedu, K; Mabey, D (2013). "Yaws". Lancet. 381 (9868): 763–73. doi:10.1016/S0140-6736(12)62130-8. PMID 23415015. S2CID 208791874.
- Mitjà O; Corbacho-Monné M; Ubals M; at al. (2021). "A Cluster-Randomized Trial of Hydroxychloroquine for Prevention of Covid-19". New England Journal of Medicine. 384 (5): 417–27. doi:10.1056/NEJMoa2021801. ISSN 0028-4793. PMC 7722693. PMID 33289973.
