= Edifici de Sindicats =

Monumental building in Barcelona, Spain

Coordinates: 41.3837°N 2.1794°E

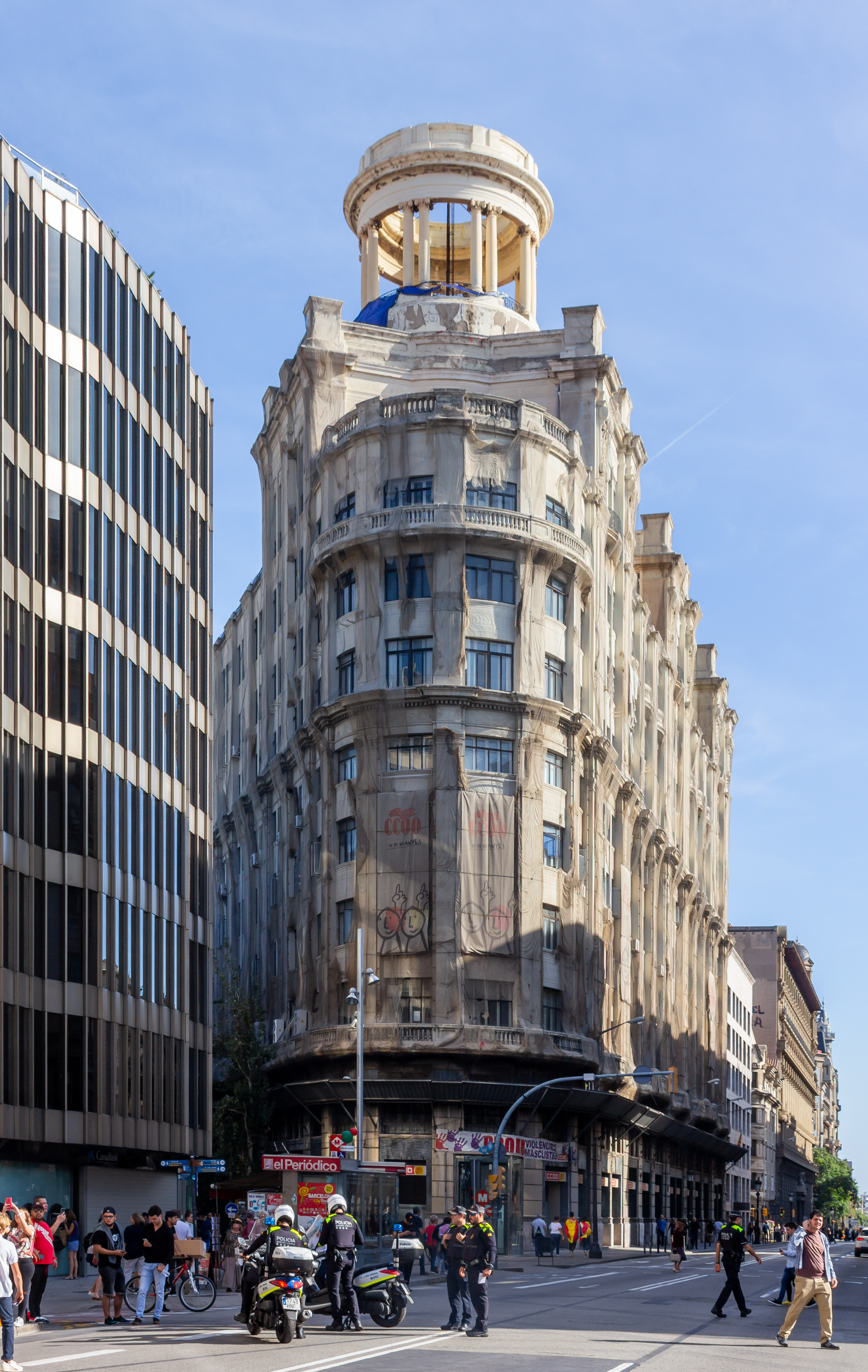
- Interactive map of the Edifici de Sindicats area

General information
- Status: Completed
- Location: Barcelona
- Completed: 1925

Edifici de Sindicats is monumental building in Barcelona. Built in 1925, initially occupied by the Caixa Mútua Popular ("People's Mutual Savings Bank"), later by the Francoist "vertical labor union" and finally by the democratic union organizations.

== Architecture ==
The building is roughly triangular, with two main façades and a semicircular chamfer at the corner where they meet, between Via Laietana and Carrer Argenteria in Barcelona. The building is articulated by the vertical lines of the doors and windows, interrupted discontinuously by the horizontals of the balconies. The most characteristic visual feature is the large circular structure in the style of a classical temple, atop the building at its apex. The building falls within the functionalist style that began to prevail at the time for administrative buildings. Building has 42 m (138 ft) height and has 11 floors. Architectural style: neoclassicism, architect: Josep Domènech Mansana (es).
