= La Rambla (Madrid Metro) =

Madrid Metro station

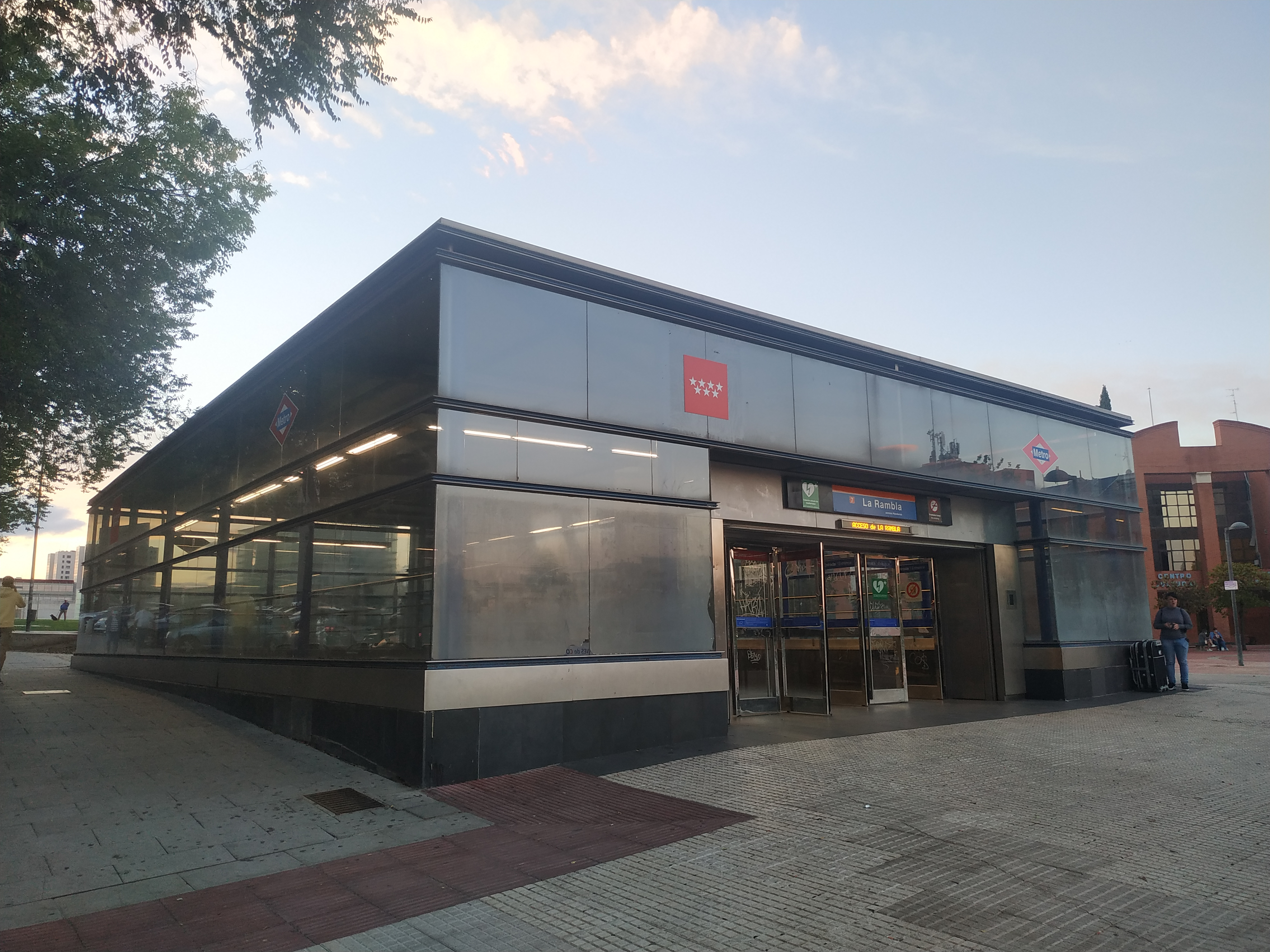

General information
- Location: 2nd district of Coslada, Madrid; Spain
- Coordinates: 40.4251478°N 3.5479247°W
- System: Madrid Metro station
- Owner: CRTM
- Operator: CRTM

Construction
- Accessible: yes

Other information
- Fare zone: B1

History
- Opened: 5 May 2007; 19 years ago

Services
Preceding station	Madrid Metro	Following station
San Fernando towards Hospital del Henares	Line 7	Coslada Central towards Pitis
Location
- Location within Madrid

La Rambla ([la ˈrambla], "The Promenade," referring to the area between the Calle de Honduras and Avenida de los Príncipes de España) is a station on Line 7 of the Madrid Metro. It is located in fare Zone B1.
