= Jarama (Madrid Metro) =

Madrid Metro station

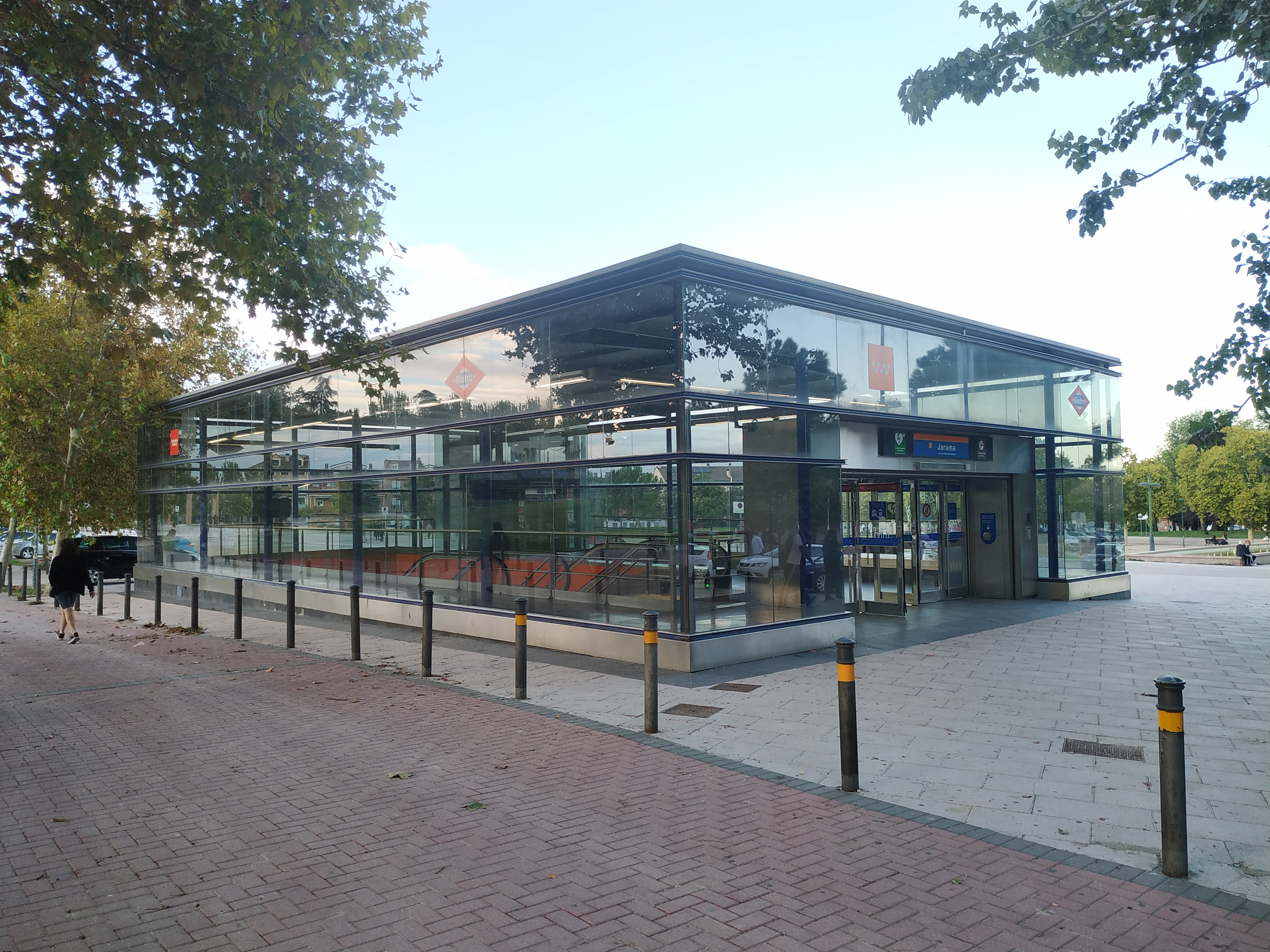

General information
- Location: San Fernando de Henares, Madrid; Spain
- Coordinates: 40.4229543°N 3.5254977°W
- System: Madrid Metro station
- Owner: CRTM
- Operator: CRTM

Construction
- Accessible: yes

Other information
- Fare zone: B1

History
- Opened: 5 May 2007; 19 years ago

Services
Preceding station	Madrid Metro	Following station
Henares towards Hospital del Henares	Line 7	San Fernando towards Pitis
Location
- Location within Community of Madrid

Jarama [xaˈɾama] is a station on Line 7 of the Madrid Metro, named for the nearby Jarama river. It is located in fare Zone B1.
