= Joaquim Maria Puyal =

Spanish journalist

Joaquim Maria Puyal i Ortiga
- Born: March 24, 1949 (age 77); Barcelona, Catalonia, Spain
- Education: Universitat de Barcelona, Universitat Autònoma de Barcelona
- Occupations: Television and radio journalist
- Notable credit(s): Catalunya Ràdio, Televisió de Catalunya, Ràdio Barcelona (1967-1985), Televisión Española

Joaquim Maria Puyal i Ortiga (born March 24, 1949) is a Catalan Spanish (by citizenship) journalist known for his work in television and radio.

== Biography ==
He was born on March 24, 1949, in the city of Barcelona. He graduated in romance philology at the Universitat de Barcelona and later obtained a degree in Communication Sciences (Ciències de la Comunicació) from the Universitat Autònoma de Barcelona. In 2010 he earned a Ph.D. degree in Linguistics by the Universitat de Barcelona, defending an Extraordinary Awarded thesis.

Since 1976 he has developed his career exclusively in the Catalan language, believing that the work of journalists could play a decisive role in the linguistic normalization of Catalan after forty years of repression in Francoist Spain.

Since 1997 he has oriented his work toward the Universitat de Barcelona and research in the area of communications theory.

== Radio career ==
In 1967 he began to work with Ràdio Barcelona, where he would remain, in various roles, until 1985. He began his work taking turns on FM radio, then a frequency in its initial stages. The director of the station, Manuel Tarín Iglesias, proposed that Puyal broadcast a football match between FC Barcelona and Córdoba Club de Fútbol. Puyal went on to narrate more than 500 football matches in Spanish between 1968 and 1976. During this period he also broadcast boxing matches from the Gran Price and the Palau dels Esports de Barcelona. For two years he was the Barcelona correspondent for "Hora 25," led by José María García.

=== Pioneer of Catalan-language radio ===
On September 5, 1976 Puyal narrated the first Catalan-language broadcast of a football match since the Second Republic. Games had been broadcast in Catalan prior to the Spanish Civil War, but when Puyal began presenting in Catalan he had to work with linguists to create the specialized vocabulary needed to analyze football. Puyal had made the proposal to broadcast games in Catalan to the general director of Cadena SER, Manuel Terán, shortly after the death of Francisco Franco, thinking that it would be possible in the new environment of the Spanish transition to democracy, even though Spain was not yet a democracy. Cadena SER approved the project to broadcast football in Catalan on FM radio and the new program "Futbol en català" was from the beginning supported by La Caixa, which paid for all its expenses. The program quickly attracted a large audience.

In 1985 Puyal left Ràdio Barcelona and signed with Catalunya Ràdio with his entire team, including Antoni Bassas and Eduard Boet. Since then, and for more than two decades, he has narrated every official match played by FC Barcelona, for a total of more than 2,000 football matches during his career. All official FC Barcelona matches can be heard on "La transmissió d'en Puyal" on Catalunya Ràdio. In 2007, he was commentator in a game between FC Barcelona vs Getafe CF. At 28th minutes in the game, Puyal made his famous "Encara Messi", which means "Still Messi" in his native Catalan language (people confused the similar sounding words Encara and the Turkish capital city Ankara, which is why the play is sometimes called "Ankara Messi") call when 19-year-old rising Barcelona player Lionel Messi dribbled his way through the Getafe defence to score starting from slightly behind the half line. The call would go down as one of the greatest and most famous calls in football (soccer) history.

== Television career ==
Joaquim Maria Puyal's popularity and prestige is due as much to his radio career as to his work in television. He has directed, produced and presented various programs, all in the Catalan language and briefly in the Spanish language.

He began his relationship with the small screen in the Miramar studios, on the Catalan circuit of Televisión Española. He started out in 1977 presenting the program "Vostè Pregunta" ("You Ask"), with a format then unprecedented in Spanish television. The program earned him the second Ondas Award of his career in 1979.

Apart from presenting his show in Catalan, he also hosted a number of programmes for national airing in Spanish, such as "Memorias del Cine Español" ("Memories of Spanish Cinema") (1978), "Mano a mano" ("Hand in Hand") (1981) and the first edition of the nightly talk show, "Buenas Noches" ("Good Night") (1982), with Mercedes Milá. But after that first broadcast, he tendered his resignation, due to an alleged incompatibility with the performance of other activities.

In 1985, he signed with Televisió de Catalunya to direct and present, on TV3, the program "Vostè Jutja" ("You Judge") which aired for two years. In 1989, he hosted the topical debate program "La Vida en un xip", which ran until 1992, and from 1993 to 1994 he presented "Un tomb per la vida," a program in which he invited well-known people to talk about their lives. During this same time he directed three programs for TV3 for which he was not the presenter, "Tres pics i repicó", "El joc del segle" and "L'indret de la memòria".

He has been a mentor to notable Catalan journalists to whom he gave their first professional opportunity, including Antoni Bassas, Eduard Boet, Pilar Calvo, Xavier Bosch, Marcel Gorgori, Manel Fuentes, Ricard Torquemada and Mònica Terribas.

== Awards and distinctions ==
He has received four Ondas Awards, awarded by Ràdio Barcelona of Cadena SER

- 1978: National Ondas Award for Radio
- 1979: National Ondas Award for Television for the TVE program "Vostè Pregunta"
- 1986: National Ondas Award for Television for the TV3 program "Vostè Jutja"
- 2004: National Ondas Award for Radio for Most Distinguished Career or Professional Work, "for his personal style of doing sports radio, which he initiated 28 years ago and currently uses with success on Catalunya Ràdio"

In addition, in 1993 Puyal was honored with the Creu de Sant Jordi and in 1997 with the Premi Nacional a la Projecció Social de la Llengua Catalana awarded by the Generalitat de Catalunya. In 2004 Puyal and his Futbol a Catalunya Ràdio team were awarded the Generalitat's Premi Nacional de Radiodifusió, Televisió, Internet i Telecomunicacions in the radio broadcasting category. In 2005 he received the second annual Manuel Vázquez Montalbán Prize for sports journalism.

He has also been honored with the 1983 Premi Ciutat de Barcelona and three awards given by Òmnium Cultural (for "Vostè pregunta" in 1983, "Vostè jutja" in 1986 and "Futbol en català" in 1991). Puyal was recognized as the "best radio announcer" and "best television presenter" of the 20th century in a popular vote for the "Els números 1 de les Comunicacions del segle XX" conducted by the Ràdio 4 and Eutelsat program "L'Altra Radio."

In 2010 he was awarded by the Universitat Rovira i Virgili with a doctorate honorary degree.

In 2019 he was awarded by the Autonomous University of Barcelona with a doctorate honorary degree.
