= University of Lleida =

Public university in Lleida, Spain

Coordinates: 41°37′42″N 0°35′49″E

- Universitat de Lleida
- Established: 1300; 726 years ago (refounded 1991)
- Affiliations: Vives network
- Vice-Chancellor: Jaume Puy Llorens
- Faculty: 818
- Administrative staff: 537
- Students: 10,625
- Location: Lleida, Catalonia, Spain
- Website: www.udl.cat (engl.)

University rankings

Global – Overall
- ARWU World: 701–800 (2023)
- QS World: 1001–1200 (2024)
- THE World: 801–1000 (2024)
- USNWR Global: =1106 (2023)

The University of Lleida (officially in Catalan: Universitat de Lleida) is a university based in Lleida, Catalonia, Spain. It was the first university founded in Catalonia and in the ancient Crown of Aragon. It was founded in 1300, using the name of Estudi General de Lleida.

It was reestablished on 12 December 1991, after a lapse of three hundred years, by the Catalan Parliament. In addition to the historical central edifice located in Rambla d'Aragó, new campuses and buildings have been added.

== History ==
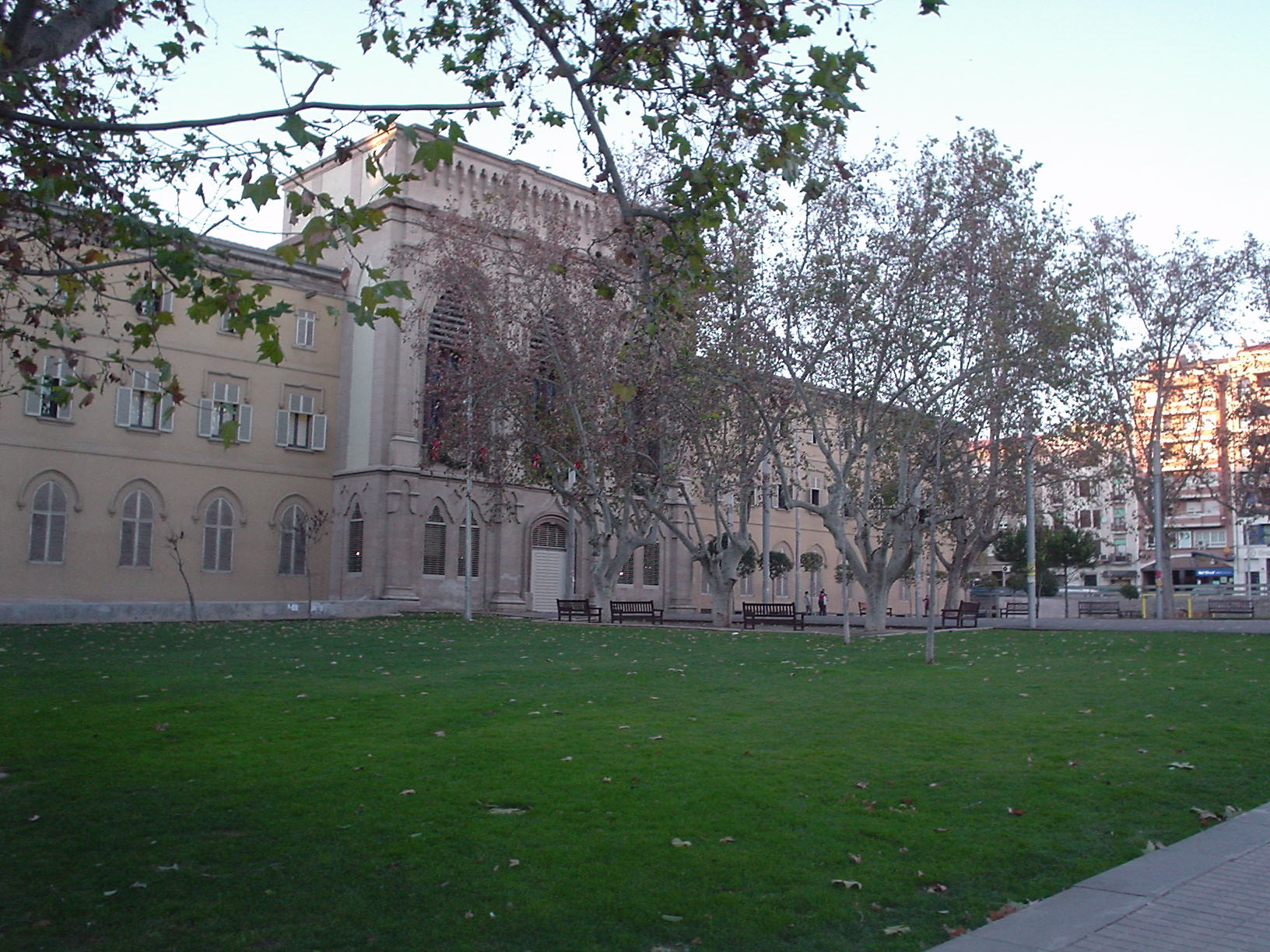
Rambla d'Aragó campus

In 1297, Pope Boniface VIII authorized the establishment of a university in the Crown of Aragon. In 1300, James II of Aragon used the papal authorization to establish the Estudi General de Lleida.

As the only university in the Crown of Aragon, the city of Lleida prospered when citizens from across the kingdom came to attend the new university. The school was funded by both the city of Lleida and the local the cathedral chapter.

Lleida and the Studium Generale Lleida continued to grow as a successful university town until the 16th century, when other universities were founded in the kingdom, robbed the university of some of its prestige as the only university in the region. While still a prominent university, it suffered a long period of decline through the 17th century. After the War of the Spanish Succession, reformers implemented a new university model. Cervera, a town east of Lleida, was chosen to be the location of the first of a new type of university. Cervera had supported King Philip V while Lleida had opposed him from the beginning of the war. It was decided that the older universities model would be removed as punishment for the lack of support from the Principality of Catalonia. On 9 October 1717, a royal decree from Philip V ordered the closure of Estudi General of Lleida along with other Catalan universities.

In 1841, the foundation of a teacher training school marked the first step towards the foundation of the Universitat de Lleida. However, it would be another 125 years before more progress was made, and other studies were revived as extensions of other universities in Barcelona. Finally, on 30 December 1991, the Catalan Parliament passed an act which brought the various studies together, and founded the Universitat de Lleida with Víctor Siurana i Zaragoza as its director. The foundation of the Universitat de Lleida was formalized after the creation of the Statutes of the Universitat de Lleida on 27 October 1994.

== Education ==
The Universitat de Lleida offers 38 different bachelor's degrees across 14 fields, ranging from Agriculture & Forestry to Natural Sciences & Mathematics. The field that offers the largest selection of bachelor's programs is the Engineering & Technology programs, which offer seven different bachelor's degrees.

The Universitat de Lleida is a leading institution in Spain for research and education in the fields of Agronomy, Food Technology and Forestry. It is the only university in Catalonia to offer Forestry Services.

The university also offers a total of 29 master's programs in 12 fields, with seven master's degrees in their Education & Training program, making it their most diverse field for postgraduate studies.

Additionally, the Universitat de Lleida has awarded Honorary degrees to leading personalities such as Javier Pérez de Cuellar, John Elliot, Stanley M. Goldberg, and Theodore H. Hsiao, as recognition of their accomplishment.

== Campuses ==
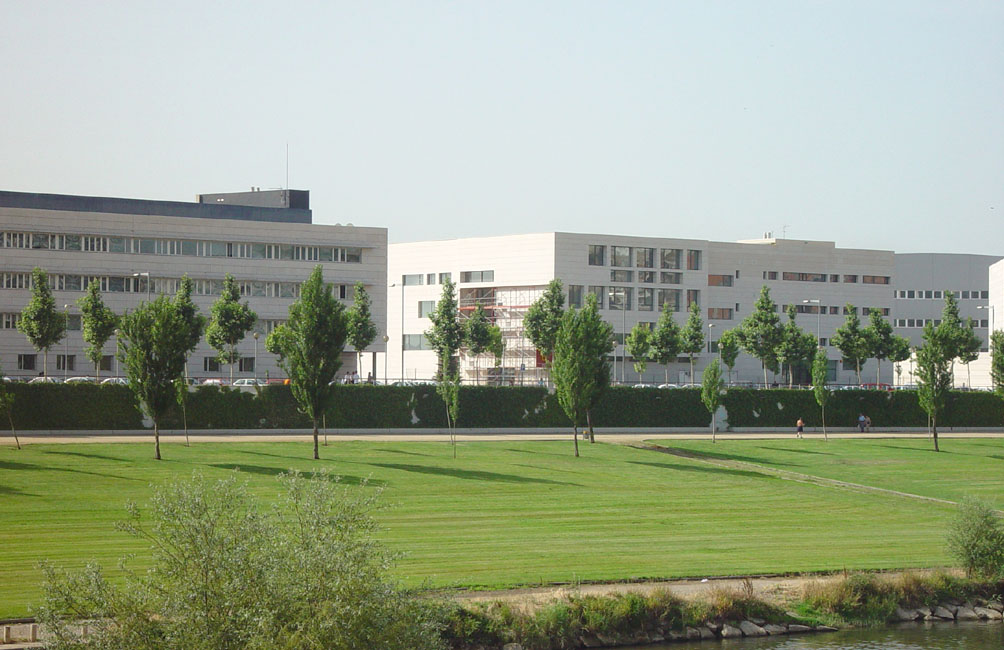
Cappont campus

The Universitat de Lleida is divided into 5 campuses, one of them in the city of Igualada. Each campus is further divided into schools and faculties. The Universitat de Lleida has a total of 26 departments of education.

The university has affiliated programs at the Escola Universitària de Relacions Laborals (EURL), The Ostelea School of Tourism and Hospitality, and the Institut Nacional d'Educació Física de Catalunya (INEFC).

The university has 3 affiliated research centres in the fields of agronomy: AGROTECNIO, medical sciences: IRB Lleida, and forestry: Forest Sciences Centre of Catalonia (CTFC)

== See also ==
- Vives Network
- List of medieval universities
- List of universities in Spain
- List of forestry universities and colleges
