= Cappont =

Neighbourhood in Lleida, Catalonia, Spain

Coordinates: 41°36′43.34″N 0°37′55.40″E

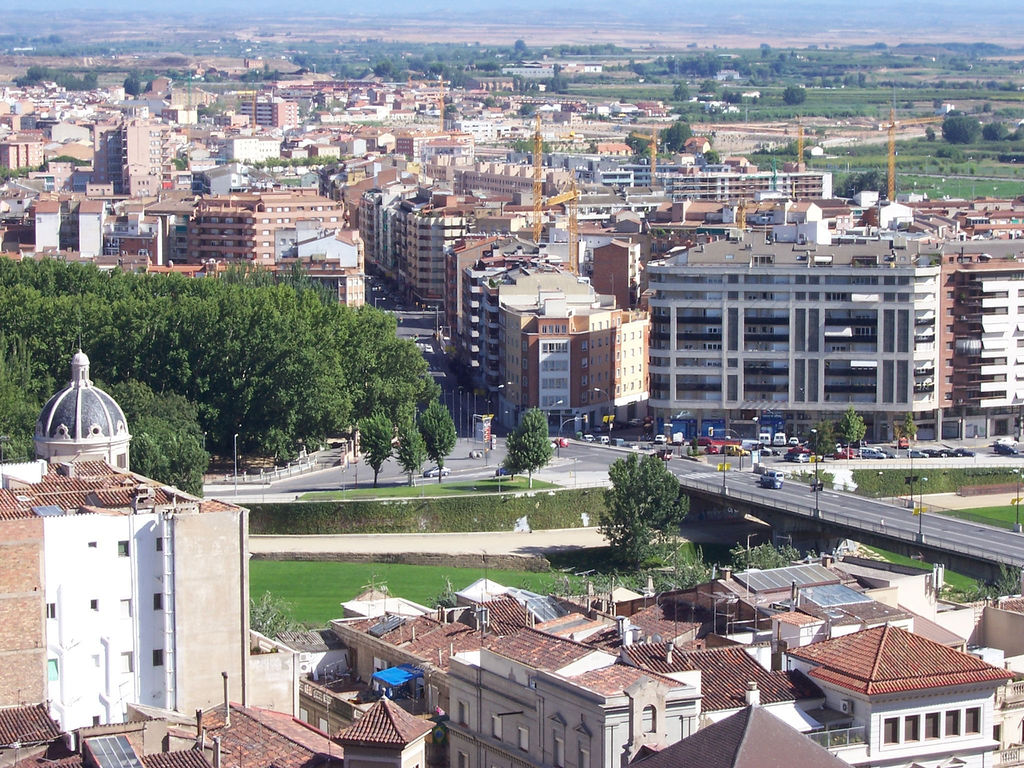
View of Cappont from the Seu Vella.

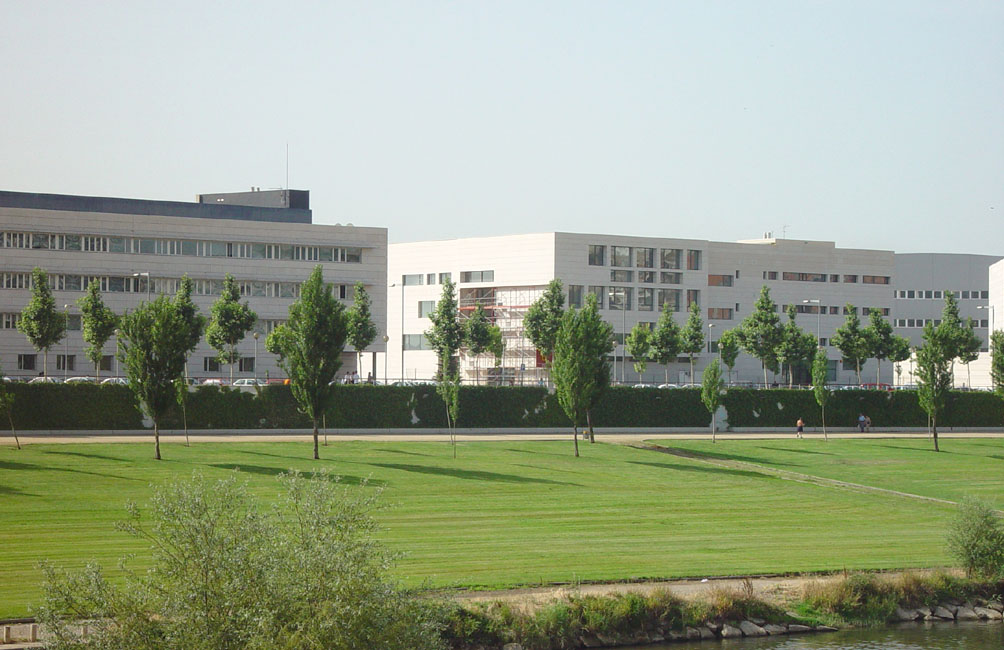
University of Lleida Cappont Campus.

Cappont (Catalan pronunciation: [ˌkapˈpɔn], often spelled Cap-Pont) is a neighbourhood in Lleida, Catalonia, Spain.

It stretches along the eastern bank of the Segre river. Cappont contains the city's largest park, the Camps Elisis, and one of the University of Lleida campus.

The district had 11,612 inhabitants as of 2008.

The neighborhood's public school celebrated 20 years in 2024.

== See also ==
- Districts and neighbourhoods of Lleida
