= Castle of La Suda =

Ruined castle in Lleida, Catalonia, Spain

Castle of La Suda or the King's Castle
- Lleida in Spain
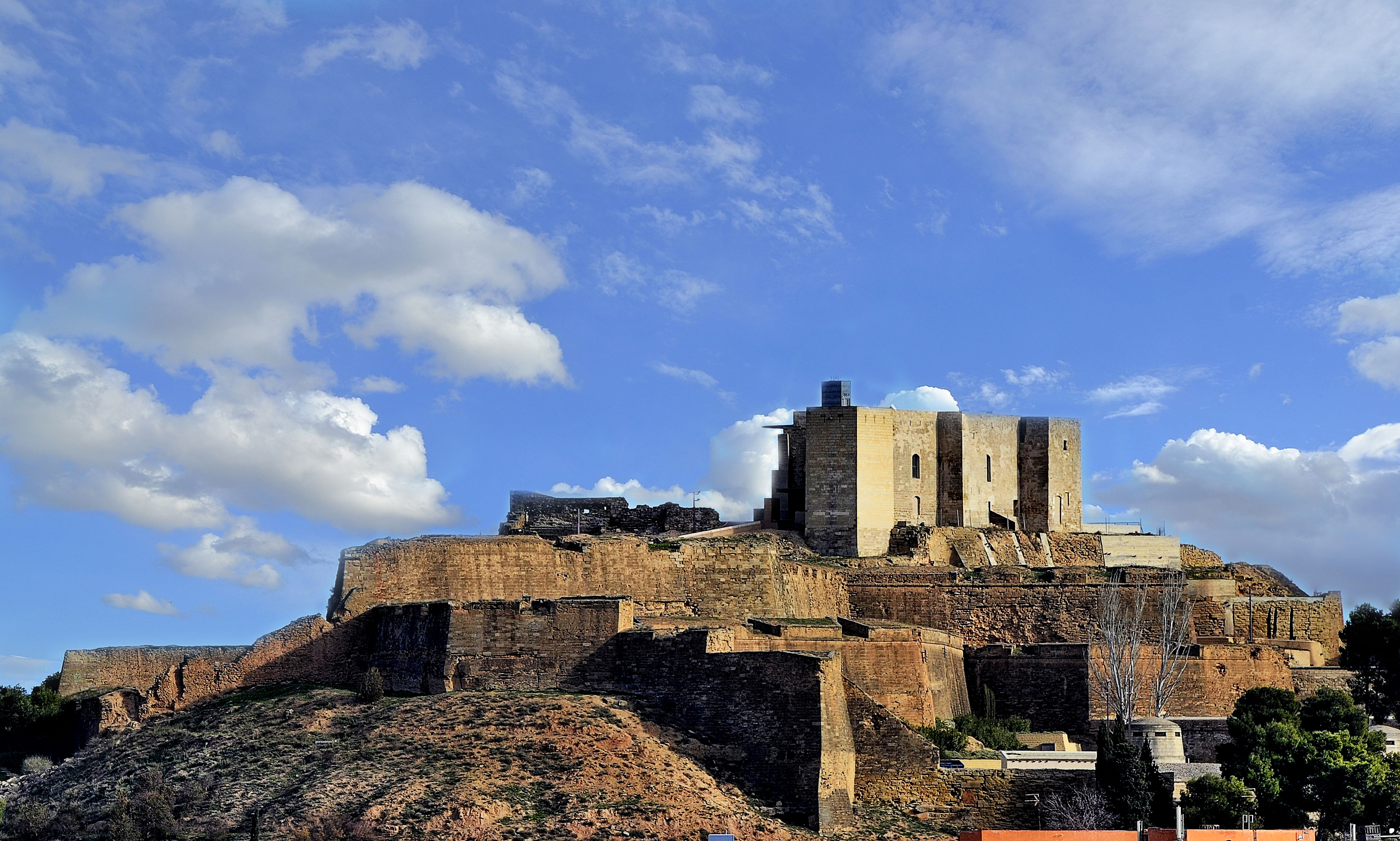
- View of the castle ruins (2012)

Location
- Coordinates: 41.6187°N 0.6260°E

Site history
- In use: Late 11th century – 20th century
- Events: Battles and sieges of Lleida

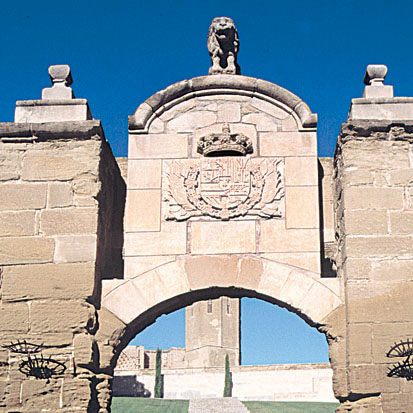
The Porta del Lleó [Lion's Gate], the main entrance to the fortified complex (2005)

The Castle of La Suda, also known as the Castell del Rei [King's Castle], is a large ruined fortress-palace overlooking the city of Lleida, Catalonia, Spain. The currently visible Romanesque-Gothic complex, dating from the 13th and 14th centuries, when it was used as a royal palace, was built over a 9th-century kasbah andalusí. By the main entrance to the fortified complex, the Puerta del León [Lion's Gate], are the remains of the Roman wall dating to before 26-16 BC. Successive walls were built over and along it in the 9th to 10th centuries, the 14th century and in the 19th century.

The Court session held there in 1214 is notable for being the occasion on which James I of Aragon, then aged six, was recognised by the Catalans and the Aragonese and crowned King of Aragon. The signing of the Querimonia, by which James II of Aragon granted autonomy to the Aran Valley in 1313, and the Paréages of Andorra (1278 and 1288), which codified the joint sovereignty over the territory of Andorra, also took place at the palace.

The fortress was used as a military headquarters during the Reapers' War and remained as such until it was demilitarised in 1941. During the War of the Spanish Succession, an explosion in the arsenal destroyed most of the original castle. Although the castle-palace was declared a national monument in 1931, it continued to be used as a military facility until its demilitarisation.

It shares the hill with the Old Cathedral of Lleida, the foundation stone of which was laid in 1203 following the conquest of the Muslim city of Larida in 1149 by the Catalan counts Ramon Berenguer IV and Ermengol VI. On a neighbouring hill, just over a mile away, there is another fortress, the Romanesque 12th-century Gardeny Castle, built by the Knights Templar, and which defends the only accessible side of the castle. In the 19th century, at the time of Suchet's siege, there were also the two strong fortifications of San Fernando and Pilar.

The name Suda, from an Arabic word meaning 'enclosed urban area', refers to the 9th-century Moorish fortress, the city's principlal castle. (Note: The term is also used in the name of the Castle of La Suda, also known as La Suda de Tortosa, in Tortosa, Tarragona.)

== Known origins ==
Occupying eight hectares, excavations show that the castle had been occupied by the Hudid dynasty between 1046 and 1092.

Ramon Berenguer IV, Count of Barcelona had, a year prior to the siege, agreed with Ermengol VI, Count of Urgell on how to divide Lleida once captured. Ermengol would hold La Suda in fief and the town itself would be divided between the two counts.

On the other hand, the fort at Gardeny, belonging to Ermengol since he captured it in around 1147, had probably been built by around 1122 under Alfonso the Battler during a previous siege on the town. Berenguer likely stayed there in 1149 during his successful seven-month siege. On capturing Lleida that year, he likely invested Guillem Ramon de Montcada, the father of William I, Viscount of Béarn, as the castà (castellan) of La Suda.

== Sieges ==
=== Reconquista ===
==== Siege of Lleida (1149) ====
The castle was besieged by a Catalan army led by Count Ramon Berenguer IV of Barcelona from spring to October 1149.

=== Thirty Years War ===
==== Siege of Lleida (1647) ====
Lleida was besieged between 12 May and 17 June 1647 by the French, commanded by Louis II de Bourbon-Condé. The siege was lifted due to the imminent arrival of a Spanish relief army. Other French commanders taking part in the siege included the Duke of Gramont.

===== Views of the siege =====
François Collignon's contemporary (after 1647 but before 1687) middle oblique view of the start of the siege shows, among other details, the citadel—containing the castle, the cathedral and the bishop's palace—within the city walls (and Fort Gardeny outside), as well as the lines of circumvallation abandoned just six months before by Harcourt and which the Spanish had failed to destroy.

Gabriel Perelle's contemporary (after 1647 but before 1677) middle oblique view shows the strategic position of the citadel and its castle.

=== War of the Spanish Succession (1707) ===
==== Siege of Lleida (1707) ====
On 10-11 September, troops under Berwick and Duke of Orleans commenced the lines of circumvallation in front of the city. On 12 October, the breach was made, whereupon the garrison retreated up into the castle.

The garrison of 2,500 Grand Alliance (League of Augsburg) troops, under its commander, General Heinrich von Hesse-Darmstadt, younger brother of Prince George of Hesse-Darmstadt, (Note: Although the Landgraviate of Hesse-Darmstadt, from which the family took its name, is spelt Hessen in German (due to the dative plural form of the name of the inhabitants or eponymous tribe, the Hessians), it is usually spelt Hesse in English, French and Spanish literature (See Hesse).) who was killed at the Siege of Barcelona (1705), included the British Royal Regiment of Fusiliers, which had left Plymouth in February 1706, then numbering 834 men under Lt. Col. Hunt Withers, now reduced to 500 men. After the capitulation of the castle and Gardeny, signed by Hesse-Darmstadt and the Duke of Orleans, the regiment marched out under colours, as did the whole garrison, with their baggage and two guns, but was no longer a viable fighting unit and its men were drafted into other regiments.

=== Peninsular War ===
==== Siege of Lérida (1810) ====
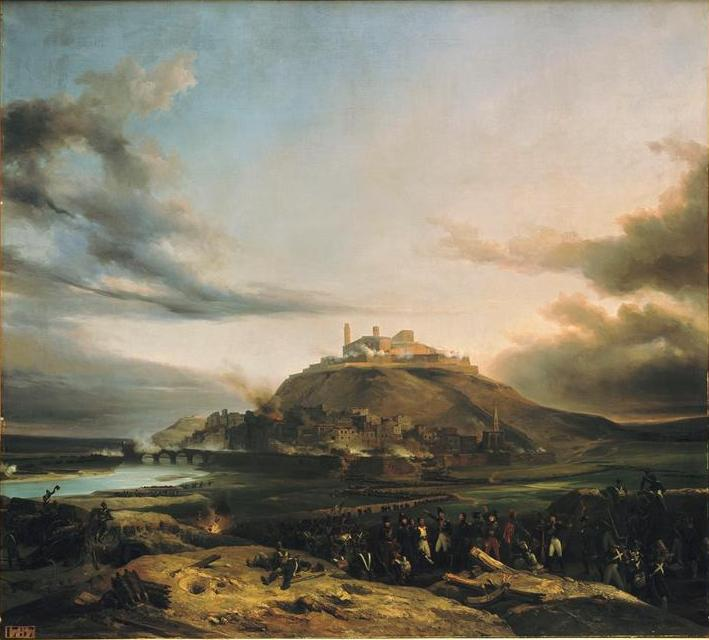
Siege of Lérida by General Suchet, 14 May 1810, by Jean-Charles-Joseph Rémond, 1836 (Palace of Versailles)

At the siege of Lérida (29 April to 13 May 1810), an Imperial French army under Louis Gabriel Suchet besieged a Spanish garrison led by Major General García Conde. On 13 May, García Conde surrendered with his 7,000 surviving soldiers. The capitulation was signed on 14 May by Garcia Conde as principal commandant of the "principal castle of the town", and by Francisco Nuñez, as commandant of the Gardeny Castle of Lleida. The other five generals taken prisoner were Felipe Perena, José Veguer, Narciso Codina, José Sangenis, and José González, governor of the castle. Perena was at Lleida because following the fall of Zaragoza he had reorganised his troops and, together with other volunteer officers, had commenced a strategy of guerrilla warfare against the French in both the Alto Aragón and in the Province of Lleida. However, at the approach of three divisions under Suchet to lay siege to the city, he had been forced to take refuge with his battalion. Half of his battalion was killed or wounded while covering the retreat of the garrison into the castle once the city wall had been breached.

Suchet began works on restoring the fortifications, but on 27 May 1810, Napoleon ordered Berthier to send a staff officer to Suchet with instructions to use the gunpowder recovered from the fortress to raze it, leaving only a fortress able to be garrisoned by 500–600 men with provisions for six months.

== 20th century ==
Although the castle-palace had been declared a national monument in 1931, it continued to be used as a military facility until its demilitarisation in 1941. There had also been attempts since 1886 to declare the Old Cathedral a national monument but, due to the Carlist Wars, the government was more interested in keeping it as part of the city's defences, and it was not until 1918 that it attained that status, although it was not until several years later that it was demilitarised and restorations works could commence. The first archeological excavations of the castle were carried out in the 1980s.

== See also ==
- Battles and sieges of Lleida
