= José Veguer =

Spanish army officer (18th–19th centuries)

- Born: Spain
- Rank: Colonel
- Conflicts: War of the Pyrenees; Peninsular War; Battle of Tudela; Second siege of Zaragoza; Siege of Lérida

José Veguer y Martiller (fl. 18th century – 19th century) was a mathematician and colonel of Spain's Corps of Engineers.

== Early career ==
In 1790, Veguer obtained a post as teacher of Mathematics at the School of San Isidro in Madrid. In 1803, he was appointed captain of a company of Sappers in Spain's first Corps of Engineers, the Regiment of Sappers, garrisoned at Guadalajara.

== Peninsular War ==
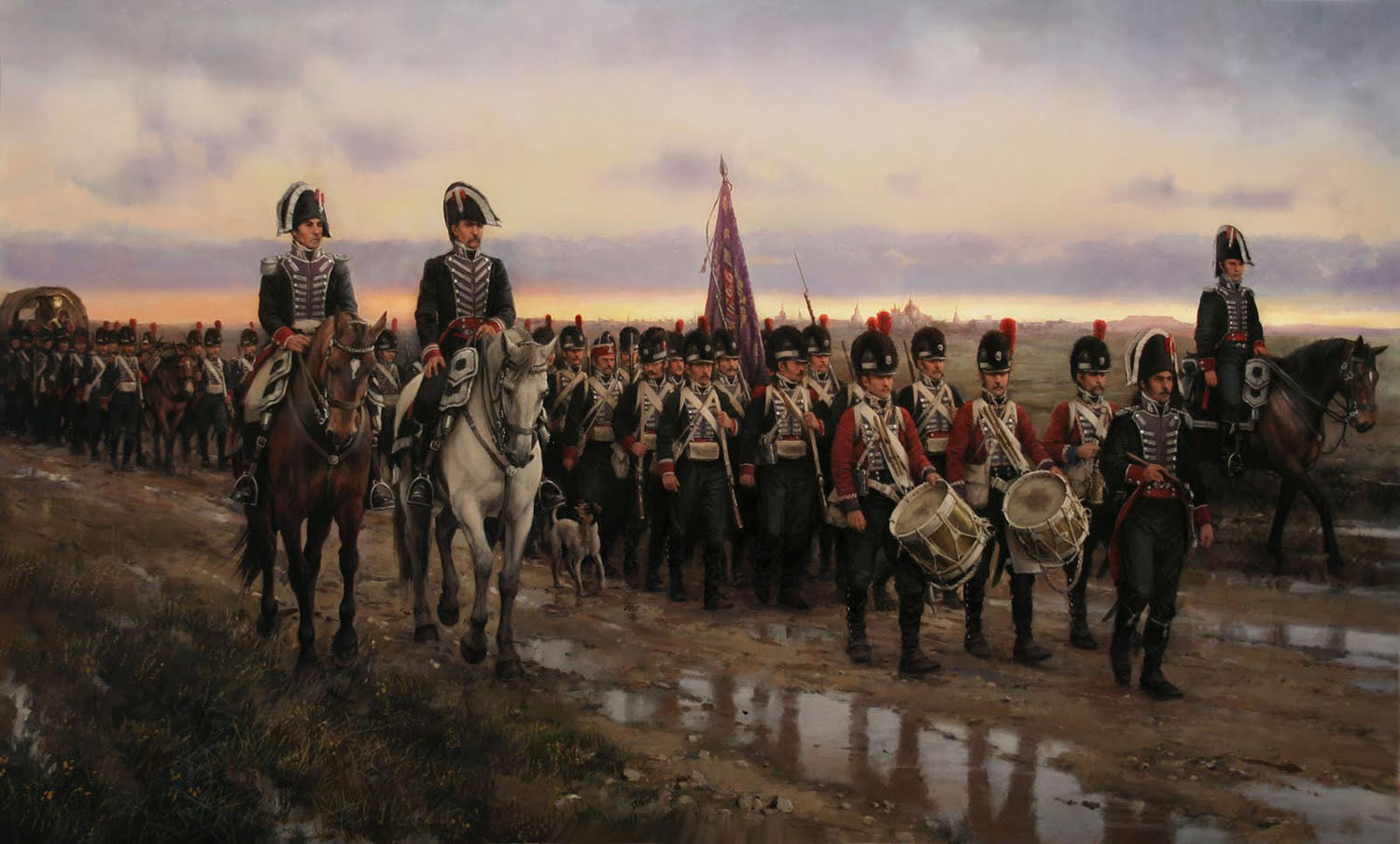
Regimiento Real de Minadores-Zapadores abandonando Alcalá de Henares el 24 de mayo de 1808 [The Royal Regiment of Sappers abandons Alcalá de Henares on 24 May 1808, by Augusto Ferrer-Dalmau (2011)

At the start of the war in 1808, as captain of one of two companies of Sappers, garrisoned at Guadalajara, Veguer played an active role in an episode known as the La fuga de los Zapadores ['The Flight of the Sappers'], in which many of the units of the Spain's Royal Regiment of Sappers Engineers, deployed around the country, together with some of the teachers and students at the military academy at Alcalá de Henares, decided to march to Valencia to fight against the French invaders, thereby becoming the first Spanish military unit as such, as opposed to individual desertions, to defy the confinement to barracks imposed on Spain's army by the Captain General of Castile, Francisco Javier Negrete, following the Dos de Mayo Uprising in Madrid. Leaving on 24 May, with colours flying, they reached Valencia on 7 June, where they reformed under Veguer, and adding two new companies of soldiers with different trades, such as carpenters, stonemasons, etc. with which Verguer formed the Valencian Regiment of Sappers, ceding his command to the superiority of the Count of Cervellón who, on 23 May, had made a call to arms against the French. (Note: On 6 June, there was a second "flight" of officers from Alcalá de Henares who refused to obey General Murat's orders to enter Madrid. This second contingent, which included the director of the Academy, Colonel Manuel de Pueyo y Díez, who had not opposed the first "flight", and Antonio Sangenis, headed for Zaragoza. (op. cit. Torres, 2004).)

Veguer's regiment fought at the Battle of Tudela (November 1808) before heading for Zaragoza, where it took part in the second siege.

In 1810, Veguer, then second-in-command of the Castle of La Suda, was one of the six Spanish generals taken prisoner at the siege of Lérida (29 April – 13 May 1810), when an Imperial French army under Louis Gabriel Suchet besieged Llieda. The other five generals were Felipe Perena, Narciso Codina, José Sangenis, José González Lubie, and the commander-in-chief, Major General García Conde.

== Post-war career ==
Following his release, he was last known to have been in Sevilla in July 1814, when he published his Apuntes sobre el modo de establecer un ejército permanente [Notes on How to Establish a Permanent Army], several points from which, including aspects such as recruit training centres and regimental schools, were still being applied over two hundred years later. By 1815, his name no longer appeared in any military records.
