= José González Lubie =

Spanish army officer (1748–1833)

José González
- Born: c. 1748; Barcelona, Spain
- Died: 24 April 1833 (aged 84–85) Barcelona
- Conflicts
See battles
- Spanish–Algerian War (1775–1785)
  - Invasion of Algiers (1775)
- American Revolutionary War
  - Great Siege of Gibraltar
  - Invasion of Minorca (1781)
  - Great Siege of Gibraltar
- Spanish–Barbary Wars (1605–1792)
  - Siege of Oran (1790–1792)
  - Siege of Ceuta (1790–1791)
- War of the Pyrenees
  - Battle of Mas Deu
- War of the Oranges
- Peninsular War
  - Invasion of Portugal (1807)
  - Siege of Lérida

José González Lubie (c. 1748 – 24 April 1833) was a Spanish army officer.

== Early career ==
In 1767, González enlisted as a sub-lieutenant in the Regiment of Foreign Volunteers, seeing action during the amphibious assault on Algiers in 1775, where he had to take command of his company following the death of the captain and the wounding of the lieutenant.

In 1776, he was promoted to Grenadier sub-lieutenant and Fusilier lieutenant later that year. However, he was discharged at the end of the year when his regiment was disbanded.

In 1777, González was transferred to the Savoyard Regiment and saw action at the Great Siege of Gibraltar, where he was promoted to Grenadier lieutenant.

Following action at the Invasion of Minorca (1781), he was promoted to captain and returned to Gibraltar, serving under Gravina aboard the floating battery San Cristóbal when it was bombarded and destroyed in September 1782. That November, González was promoted to Fusilier captain. He then saw action at the sieges of Oran (1790–1792) and Ceuta (1790–1791).

In 1792, when the Volunteer Battalion of Tarragona was raised, he was appointed its sargento mayor (second in command).

== War of the Pyrenees ==
Integrated into the Army of Roussillon, in April 1793, his battalion saw action under Antonio Ricardos at Saint-Laurent-de-Cerdans and Céret. González was promoted to colonel in 1793 and saw action at Mas Deu, Port Vendres, Saint-Elme and at the Siege of Collioure (1794), where he was the only commander who refused to sign the capitulation.

== War of the Oranges ==
In 1801, González participated in the siege that led to the fall of Campo Maior.

== Peninsular War ==
In 1807, following the signing of the Treaty of Fontainebleau, allowing for the invasion of Portugal, González participated in the siege of Elvas led by General Solano, as one of the three auxiliary Spanish corps that aided General Junot's Army of the Gironde in invading that country. Solano was to take the garrison town of Elvas and then to march on Lisbon along the left bank of the Tagus.

Following the Spanish insurrection of May 1808, the French arrested González and imprisoned him at Setúbal, from where he escaped and was able to reach Catalonia. Once there, he again raised the Volunteer Battalion of Taragona, and participated at the Battle of Llinas (also known as the Battle of Cardedeu).

In May 1809, he was appointed governor of Lleida, and commissioned with raising the 1st and 2nd battalions of the Catalonian Legion.

In March 1810, González was promoted to field marshal and just a month later, as governor of the Castle of La Suda, was one of the six Spanish generals taken prisoner at the siege of Lérida (29 April – 13 May 1810), when an Imperial French army under Louis Gabriel Suchet besieged a Spanish garrison led by Major General García Conde. The other five generals were Felipe Perena, José Veguer, Narciso Codina, José Sangenis, and the commander-in-chief of the besieged troops, García Conde. González remained a prisoner in France until the peace treaty was signed.

== Post-war career ==
On his return to Spain, González was appointed chair of the Royal War Council of General Officers in Valencia, post he held until 1819, when he was transferred to the barracks at Barcelona.
