= Instituts-Templers =

Coordinates: 41.6101°N 0.614803°E

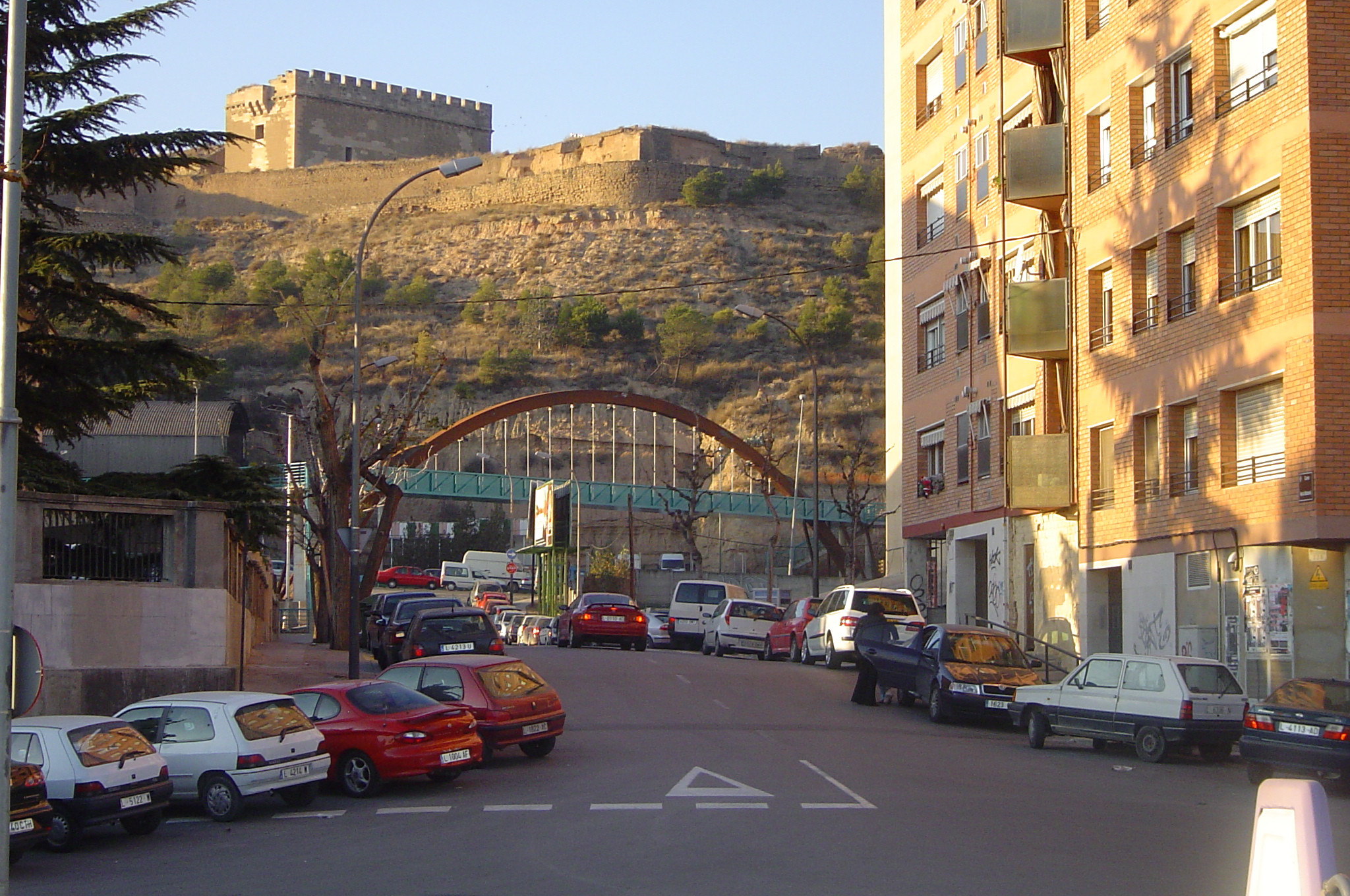
Instituts-Templers.

Instituts-Templers is a district of Lleida, Catalonia, Spain. It's made up of different areas between La Mariola, Universitat and the river Segre, mostly working-class, some middle class. "Templers-Escorxador" is located within the portion of medieval Lleida which was once owned by the Knights Templar, hence the name. "Instituts" refers to the oldest public secondary institutes or high-schools of the 20th century town, that dominate the area next to Gardeny. It has undergone serious urban regeneration during the 1990s and especially the 2000s (decade). It had over 15000 inhabitants in 2009. The Battle of Ilerda took place in this area of Roman-era Lleida, then called Ilerda.

== Landmarks ==
Landmarks include the Templar Gardeny Castle on Gardeny Hill, the Teatre Municipal de l'Escorxador complex on career de Lluís Companys, including the Cafè del Teatre and the Aula Municipal del Teatre, next to La Serreta hill, the Peasants Monument, the Acadèmia Mariana and the future Climate Change Museum, the first of its kind in Spain.

== See also ==
- Districts and neighbourhoods of Lleida
