= Auditori Enric Granados =

Coordinates: 41.6198°N 0.628281°E

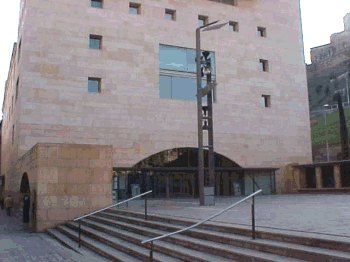
- Auditori Enric Granados overview
- Interactive map of Auditori Enric Granados
- Location: Lleida, Catalonia, Spain
- Capacity: 803
- Type: Concert hall, Theatre

Construction
- Built: 1984-1994
- Opened: 14 February 1995

Website
- Official website

Auditori Enric Granados is the main concert hall in Lleida (Catalonia, Spain) also hosting the city's music conservatory. It contains a symphonic hall with 803 seats and a chamber music hall with a capacity of 245. This music institution is named after the composer Enric Granados, who was born in Lleida in 1867. Located on Plaça Mossèn Cinto Verdaguer, the building was designed by local architects Ramon Artigues and Ramon Sanabria and opened in 1994 after ten years of construction and was officially inaugurated by Queen Sofía of Spain on 14 February 1995. Ancient remains of Lleida were found under the venue.

The building was used as the primary location for the short film Sonata in Motion. The venue has held many concerts by Spanish singers, such as Luz Casal or El Cigala.

== See also ==
- La Llotja de Lleida
- Teatre de l'Escorxador, Cafè del Teatre
- Culture in Lleida
