= Battles and sieges of Lleida =

This is a list of battles and sieges of Lleida (Spanish: Lérida).

- Battle of Ilerda (49 BC), part of Caesar's civil war
- Siege of Lleida (800), part of the Frankish conquest of the Marca Hispanica
- Siege of Lleida (884), part of the Frankish conquest of the Marca Hispanica
- Siege of Lleida (942), part of the Hungarian raid in Spain
- Siege of Lleida (1122–1123), part of the Almoravid invasion of Iberia
- Siege of Lleida (1149), part of the Reconquista
- Siege of Lleida (1413), part of the Count of Urgell's revolt
- Siege of Lleida (1464), part of the Catalan Civil War
- Battle of Lleida (1642), part of the Reapers' War
- Siege of Lleida (1644), part of the Reapers' War
- Siege of Lleida (1646), part of the Reapers' War
- Siege of Lleida (1647), part of the Reapers' War
- Siege of Lleida (1707), part of the War of the Spanish Succession
- Siege of Lleida (1810), part of the Peninsular War
- Bombing of Lleida, part of the Spanish Civil War
- Battle of Lérida (1938), part of the Spanish Civil War
