= Octavio Bianqui =

Spanish landscape painter (1872–1936)

Octavio Bianqui Sánchez
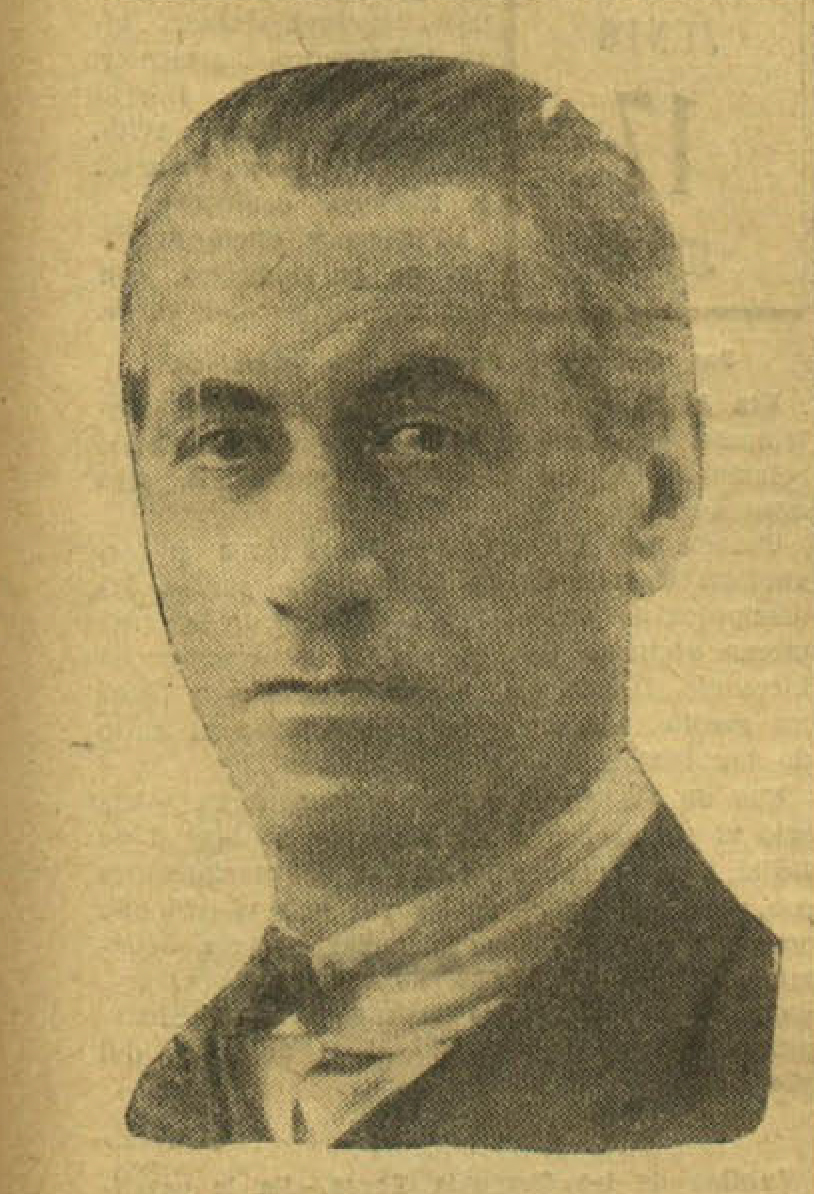
- Born: 1872; Cartagena, Spain
- Died: 1936 (aged 63–64); Barcelona, Spain

Octavio Bianqui Sánchez (1872–1936) was a Spanish great painter known for his landscape works.

== Biography ==
Born in Cartagena in tha year 1872, Bianqui travelled across Spain, painting landscapes associated with places such as High Aragon, Barcelona, Mallorca, Asturias, and La Montaña.

His works included La cala de San Vicente, Serenidad mediterránea, Pinada de Cala Molins, Día de turbonada, El rincón de la cuevona, Día de orbayu, El puente de la espinama, El pino de Velarde, El Gállego, and Armonía violeta.

Among his pupils was Cristóbal Bou Álvaro.

Bianqui is believed to have died in Barcelona in 1936.
