= Gran Passeig de Ronda, Lleida =

Coordinates: 41°37′08″N 0°36′53″E

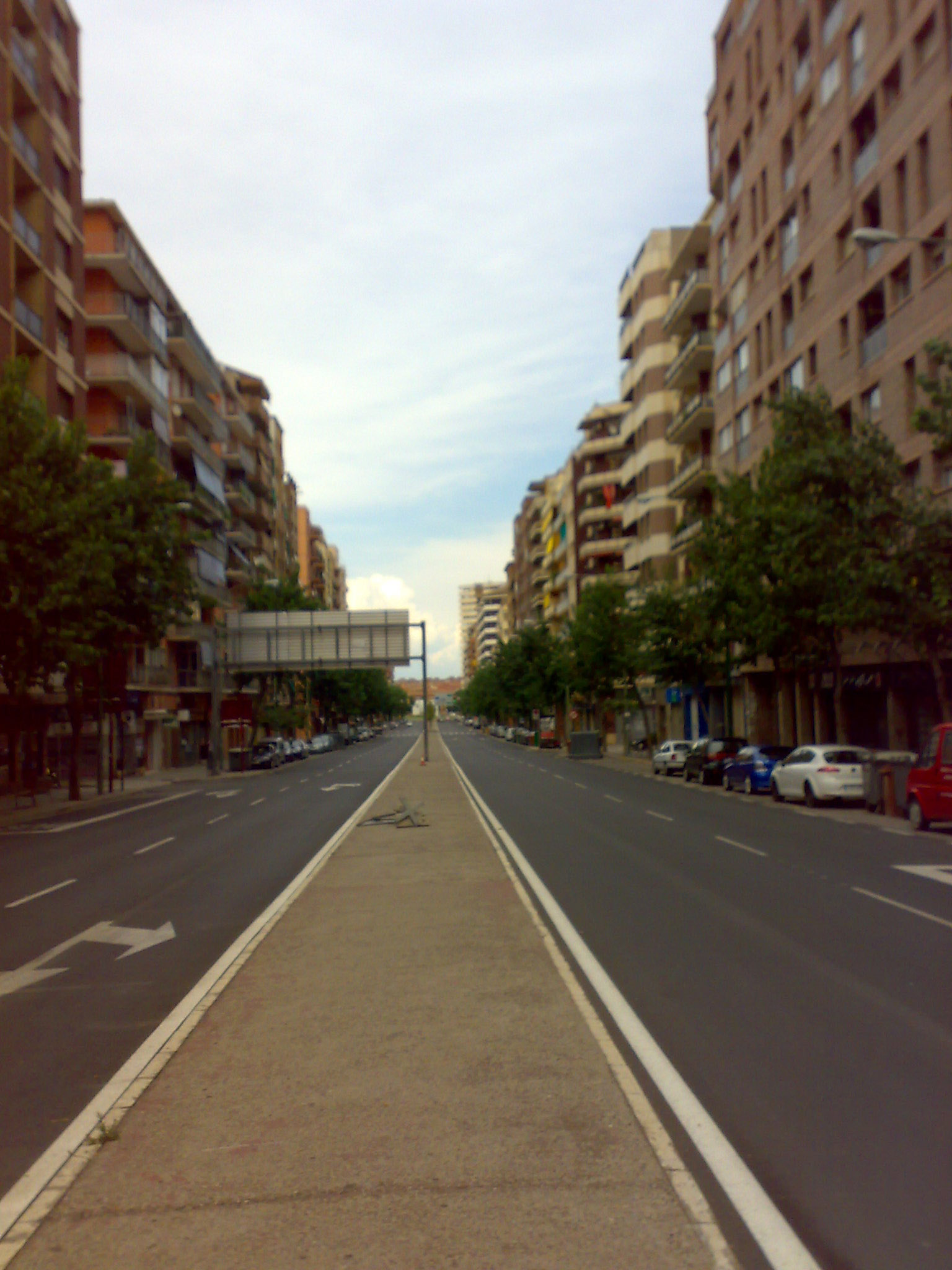

Gran Passeig de Ronda (Catalan language official name; Spanish: Gran Paseo de Ronda) is one of the main thoroughfares in the city of Lleida (Catalonia, Spain). It stretches from Plaça d'Europa towards Avinguda de l'Alcalde Areny on the bank of the river Segre, by the Pont Nou. It's located in one of the areas built ex nihilo after the destruction of the Spanish Civil War. Demographically, it separates upscale quarters of the primarily middle class areas such as middle class areas from the working-class neighbourhoods of La Mariola and Instituts-Templers and Gardeny hill. In Gran Passeig de Ronda merge the Autopista AP-2, Autovía A-2 and the N-230 road.

== Transport ==
The L2 urban bus service is called "Ronda" and covers the whole avenue.

== See also ==
- Lleida
