= Siege of Tortosa (1810–1811) =

Military confrontation between France and Spain in 1810

- Part of Peninsular War
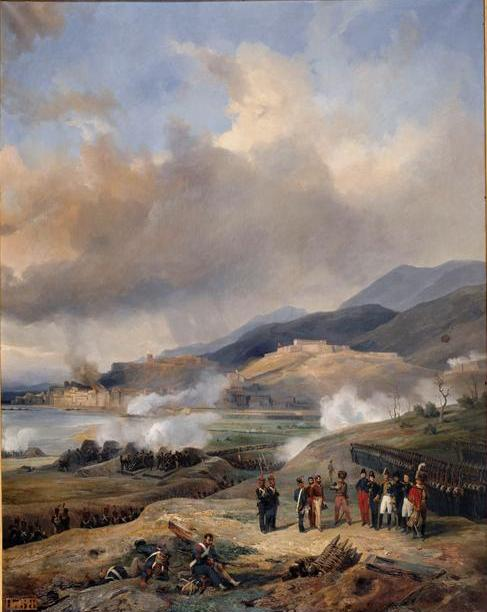
- General of division Suchet, commanding the 3rd corps of the Army of Spain, receives the capitulation of the city of Tortosa, 2 January 1811; Oil painting by Jean-Charles-Joseph Rémond, 1837
Date	16 December 1810 – 2 January 1811 (2 weeks and 3 days)
Location	Tortosa, Catalonia, Spain 40.8114°N 0.5194°E
Result	French victory

Belligerents
(France) French Empire	Kingdom of Spain

Commanders and leaders
(France) Louis Gabriel Suchet	(Spain) Miguel de Lili Idiaquez

Strength
12,000 men 58 guns	7,129 men 182 guns

Casualties and losses
~400 dead or wounded	1,400 dead or wounded 3,974 captured

Peninsular War: Aragon and Catalonia
current battle

The siege of Tortosa (16 December 1810 – 2 January 1811) pitted an Imperial French army under General Louis Gabriel Suchet against the Spanish defenders of Tortosa led by General Miguel de Lili Idiáquez, Conde de Alacha. The siege progressed swiftly and Alacha surrendered on 2 January 1811. The action took place during the Peninsular War, part of the Napoleonic Wars.

== Background ==
Tortosa is a city that lies on the Ebro river about 80 kilometres (50 mi) southwest of Tarragona. The conquest of Catalonia was not yet completed by the end of 1810, and the French did not feel secure about the positions they occupied. Tortosa was a fortified city on the lower Ebro river with ten to twelve thousand inhabitants. Its bridge over the Ebro was the only one the Spanish still controlled. Thus, Tortosa was important because it allowed communications between Tarragona and Valencia, both still in Spanish hands. The city was, therefore, much more indispensable to the Spanish than to the French.

== Siege ==
Although it had been blockaded since July 1810, Tortosa was only placed under siege in December. Until then, the French had amassed guns (52 artillery pieces), ammunition (30,000 grenades), and gunpowder (90,000 pounds or 40 tons) at the town of Xerta, 13 kilometres (8 mi) north of Tortosa. Suchet approached Tortosa with twelve infantry battalions and siege equipment. On the opposite side of the Ebro, five battalions under General Louis Jean Nicolas Abbé blocked the bridge that communicated Tortosa with Valencia and southern Spain.

The French Army of Aragon reached the walls of Tortosa on 16 December. Suchet decided to attack the city's southern wall, as the terrain in this area facilitated siege works. Works were undertaken at the location where the main attack would take place, and preparations were also made for a feint attack. The Spanish garrison executed two sorties, which were repelled by Colonel Pierre-Michel Rouelle but caused some delays in the preparation of the siege works. On 31 December, French engineers undermined the city walls and, during the night, set up four 24-pounder artillery pieces.

On the morning of 1 January, before the siege artillery began firing, the governor of Tortosa presented his terms of surrender. Suchet found them unacceptable for allowing the garrison to withdraw to Tarragona. He presented his own terms to the Count of Alacha who, after consulting his war council, decided to continue the fight. On 2 January, French artillery began shelling and quickly breached the walls of Tortosa. Alacha raised a white flag but Suchet, suspecting it to be a manoeuvre to gain time for reinforcements, repairs or defensive works, decided to proceed with preparations for the assault. Nevertheless, the assault was called off after Suchet let the defenders know that they would be massacred and the city sacked if they did not surrender under French terms. Alacha then signed the capitulation on 2 January.

== Aftermath ==
The French conquest of Aragon and Catalonia proceeded with the Battle of El Pla. The French occupied Tortosa until 18 May 1814.
