= Pere de Coma =

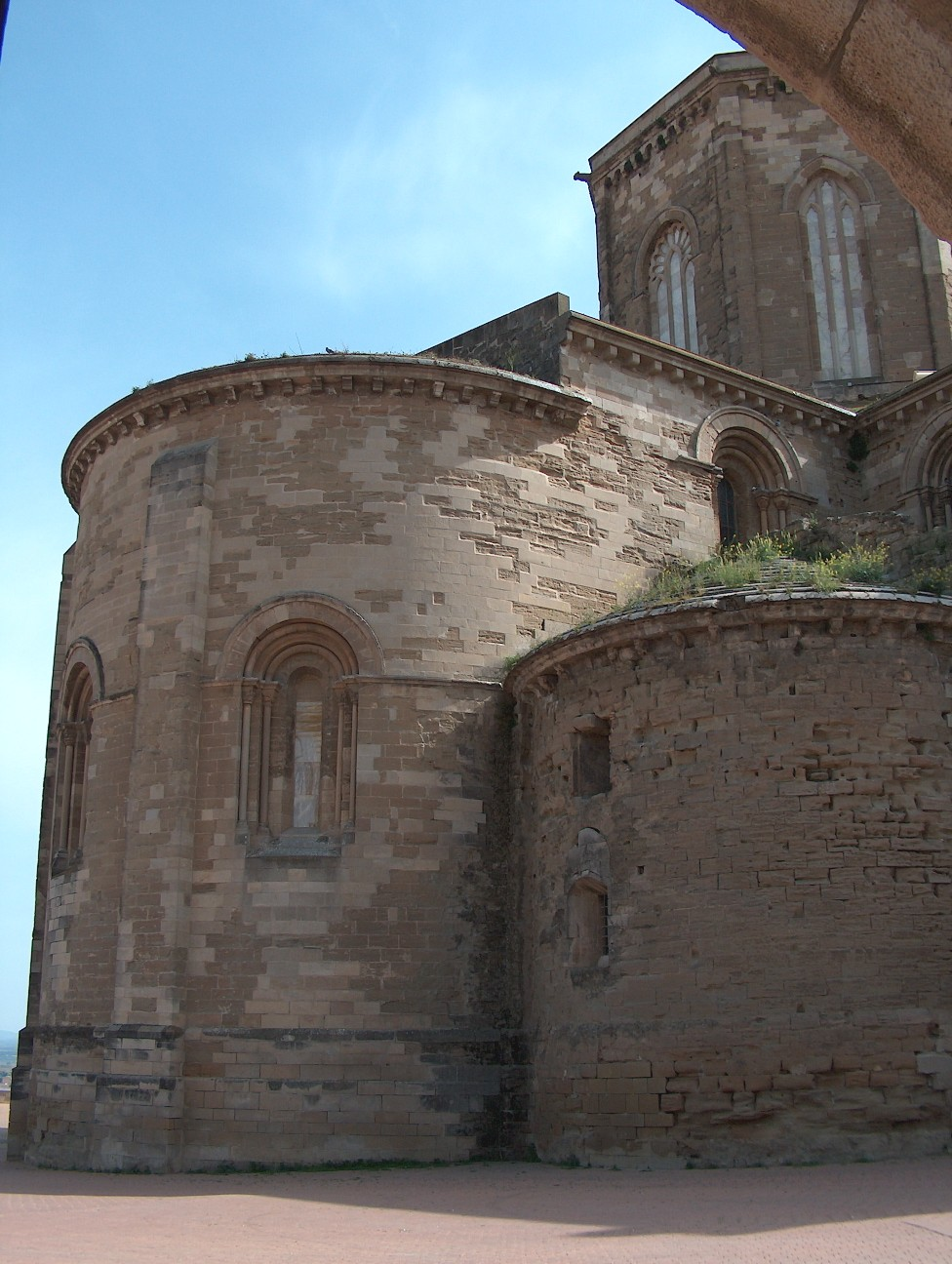
Detail of the Seu Vella, the old cathedral of Lleida, of which Pere de Coma was the first architect.

Pere de Coma was a medieval architect who died in the 13th century, the introducer of Romanesque in the Catalan city of Lleida.

His background is nowadays unknown. However, it was suggested by scholars such as Roca Florejachs (1911) that his origins lay in Lombardy, while other scholars (Lladonosa. 1970) hint at northern Catalan comarques such as Ribagorça or Solsonès. He's known to have established in Lleida by 1180, when he acquired property in the Sant Joan quarter of the city. In 1193 he asked Gombau de Camporrells, bishop of Lleida, for permission to work in the Seu Vella as a master builder. In 1203 he was hired to direct the construction of this cathedral, where he worked for almost twenty years. He built it on top of the mosque which had been in use during the time Lleida had belonged to Al Andalus. and a former, smaller Christian church. There is some scholarly dispute on whether De Coma had been hired to make the former church into a larger temple (Lladonosa, 1970) or to design a brand new one (Lacoste, 1975).

Pere de Coma's work in the Seu Vella was complemented by that of members of the so-called Lleida school of eclectic Romanesque architecture, who were of Moorish origin, and were in charge of most of the cathedral's decoration. Pere de Coma's main structure for the Seu Vella was kept at all times, including in the following century when Gothic elements were added everywhere. He was succeeded in the direction of works by a relative, one Berenguer de Coma, who was granted a statica domorum from the late Pere.

He died at Lleida.

== Sources ==
- Xavier Barral i Altet (2002), Les Catedrals de Catalunya, Barcelona, Edicions 62. ISBN 84-297-5267-6
