= Felipe Perena =

Spanish army officer and guerrilla leader (1764–1834)

- Born: 26 May 1764; Huesca, Spain
- Died: 21 September 1834 (aged 70) Ortilla (Huesca)
- Rank: lieutenant general
- Conflicts: War of the Pyrenees; Peninsular War; Second siege of Zaragoza; Battle of Leciñena; Siege of Lérida; First Carlist War

Felipe Perena y Casayús (26 May 1764 – 21 September 1834) was one of many Spanish guerrilleros who came to prominence in the Spanish War of Independence.

== Early career ==
After having graduated as a Doctor of Law in 1789, at the start of the War of the Pyrenees he raised, at his own cost, a company of 220 volunteers. In 1793 he was appointed captain and just a few days later first saw armed action. Following the Peace of Basel (1795) he was commissioned to capture bandoleros in Aragon under the orders of the captain general of that Kingdom. He was promoted to lieutenant colonel in June 1796 and then retired to look after his lands and wine business.

== Peninsular War ==
At the start of the war, Palafox named him commander of the tercios in Huesca and in August 1808 he was promoted to colonel. During the second siege of Zaragoza, he commanded the 1st Huesca Battalion. However his troops were not only raw recruits but they were also badly armed and were easily dispersed by the French at the Battle of Leciñena (January 1809). Following the fall of Zaragoza he reorganised his troops and together with other volunteer officers commenced a strategy of guerrilla warfare against the French in both the Alto Aragón and in Lerida, where he was forced to take refuge with his battalion in April 1810 at the approach of three divisions under the French general Suchet to lay siege to the city.

Just under a month later, in May 1810, the city wall of Lerida was breached and Perena's volunteer battalion covered the retreat of the garrison into the Castle of La Suda. Half of his battalion was killed or wounded. The following day, the castle garrison capitulated and Perena was captured and spent the rest of the war in different prisons in France.

== Post-war career ==
On his return to Spain in 1814, Perena was promoted to brigadier and Marshal of Spain's Royal Armies.

In 1820, his liberal sympathies led him to accept the rank of commander of the National Militia and he participated actively in military operations against the Royalists in Aragon between 1822 and 1823.

With the restoration of Ferdinand VII's absolute monarchy, Perena was prosecuted by the Real Junta de Purificaciones for his persecution of Royalists, but he was declared "purified" in 1826, and promoted to lieutenant general in 1830.

== See also ==
- Guerrilla warfare in the Peninsular War
