= Old Cathedral of Lleida =

Former Roman Catholic cathedral in Spain

- Seu Vella (Catalan)
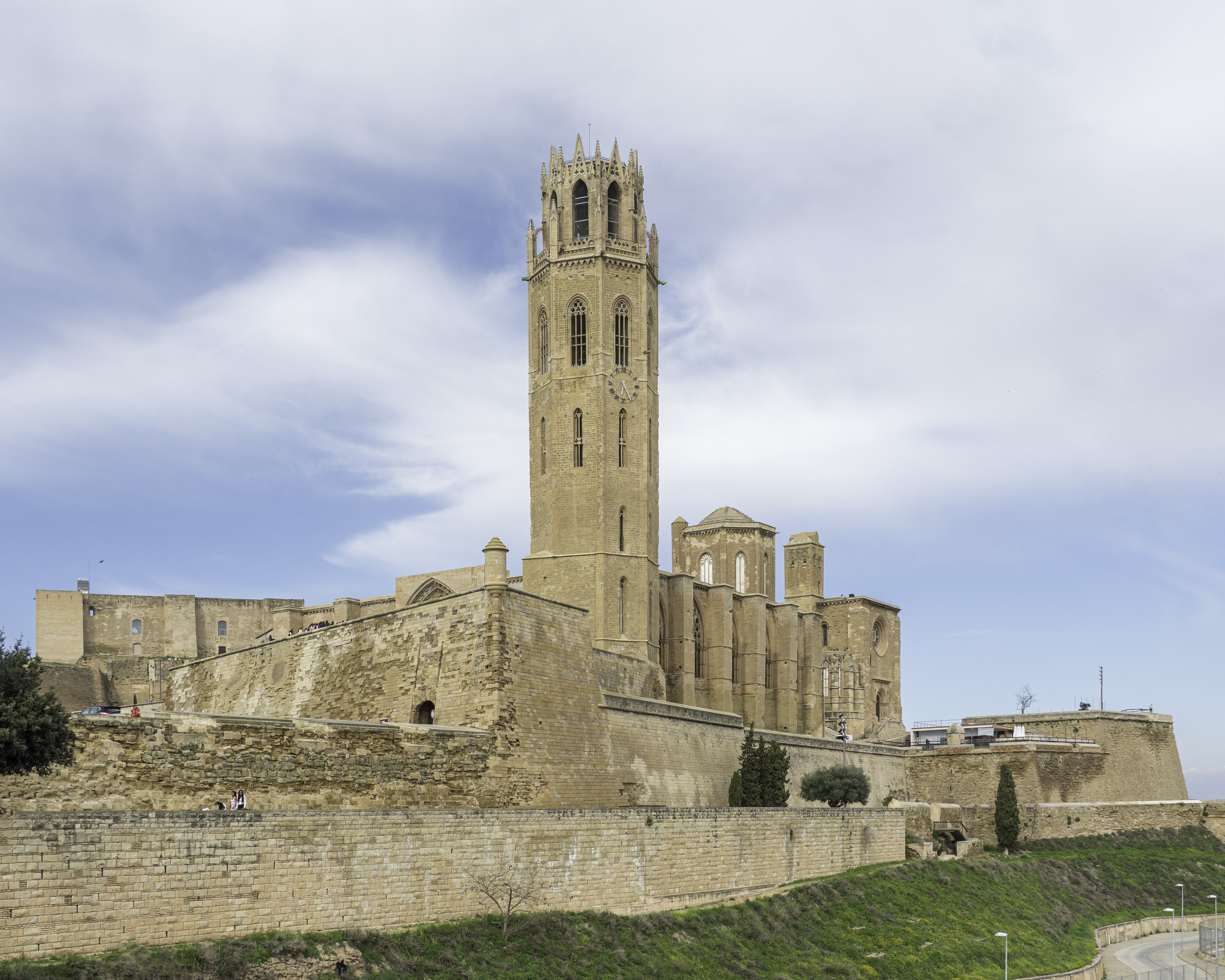
- Southwest view in 2026. The Castle of La Suda can be seen on the left, as well as the surrounding walls
- Interactive map of the Old Cathedral of Lleida area
- Former names: Cathedral of Saint Mary

General information
- Status: Former cathedral and military barracks.
- Type: Church
- Architectural style: Romanesque, Gothic
- Location: Lleida, Spain
- Year built: 12-15th Century
- Groundbreaking: 22 July 1203
- Inaugurated: 31 October 1278
- Closed: 1707 (cathedral), 1948 (barracks)

Height
- Height: 60 m (200 ft)

Design and construction
- Architect: Pere de Coma

Website
- turoseuvella.cat

Spanish Cultural Heritage
- Type: Non-movable
- Criteria: Monument
- Designated: 12 June 1918
- Reference no.: RI-51-0000156

The Old Cathedral of Lleida, also known as the Seu Vella and formerly called the Cathedral of Saint Mary, is an architectural monument in the city of Lleida, Catalonia, Spain. It is located on top of the turó de la Seu Vella, a small hill that is also the highest point of the city. It was the cathedral church of the Roman Catholic Diocese of Lleida between 1278 and 1707, a title now held by the Cathedral of the Assumption, or Seu Nova.

The Seu Vella is part of a monumental complex also integrated by the Castle of La Suda and the military fortification that surrounds them. All three elements are listed as Cultural Assets of National Interest. The monumental complex was chosen in 2021 as the "Favourite Monument of Catalonia" on a regional TV show, and in 2025 it received 63,728 visitors.

== History ==
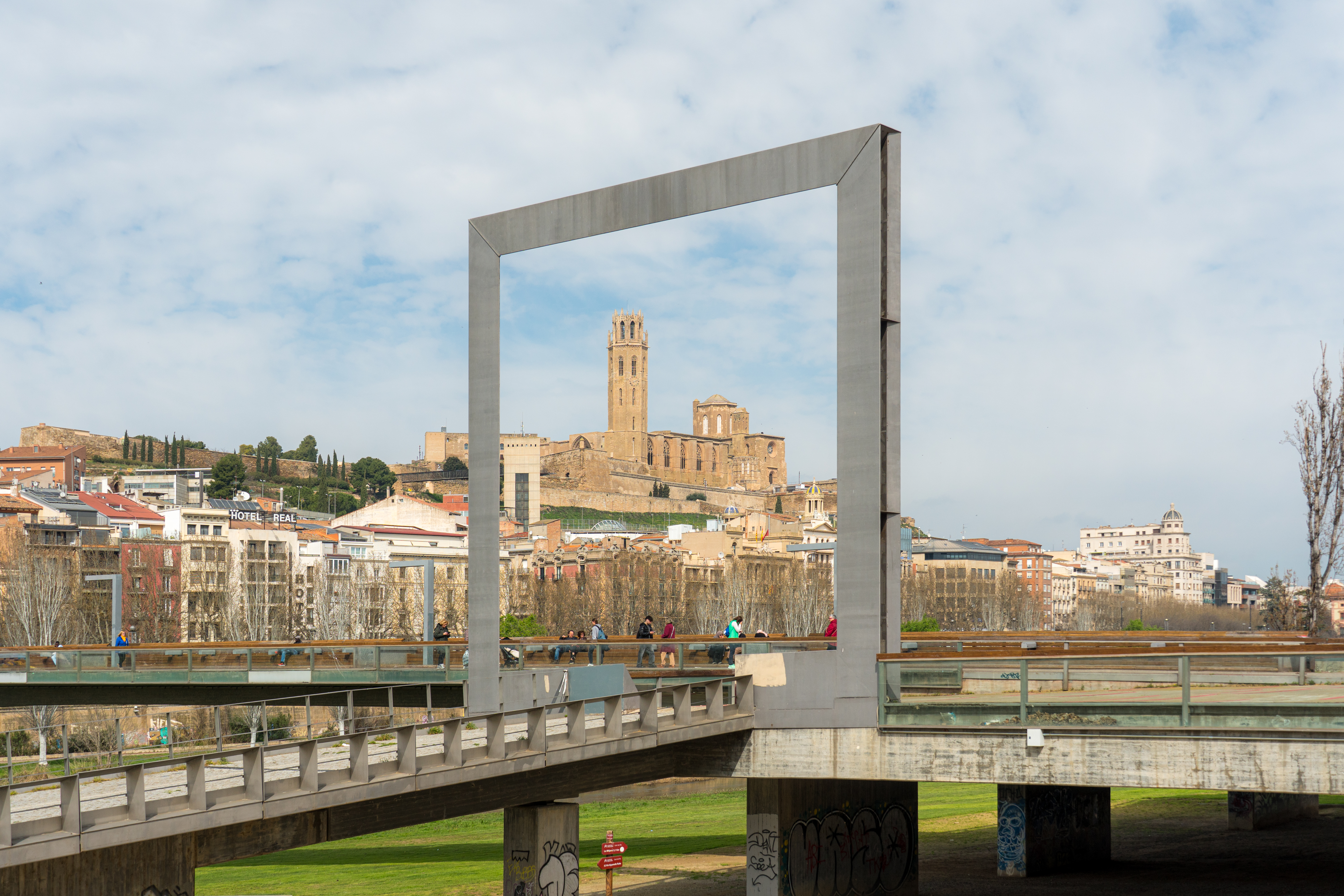
The Old Cathedral dominates the city. Here it is seen from the banks of the river Segre

The site was previously occupied by a Palaeo-Christian and Visigothic cathedral, which later, after the Islamic conquest of Spain, was rebuilt in 832 to be used as a mosque. In 1149, after the city's conquest by the Christian Ramon Berenguer IV of Barcelona and Ermengol VI of Urgell (1149), the structure was reconsecrated as "Santa Maria Antiqua", and entrusted to canons regular.

In 1193, however, the cathedral chapter ordered the construction of a new edifice, following the contemporary Romanesque architectural canons, to master Pere de Coma. The first stone was laid in 1203 by King Peter II of Aragon and count Ermengol VII of Urgell. Construction continued throughout the reign of James I of Aragon. It was consecrated to the Virgin Mary on 31 October 1278. The cloisters not were completed until the 14th century. The bell tower was begun in 14th century and finished in 1431. The portal Porta dels Apòstols begun in the 14th and completed in 15th century.

In 1707, the city was conquered by the troops of Philip V: the cathedral was converted into barracks. The building was declared a national monument in 1918, and restoration works were started in 1950.

== Description ==
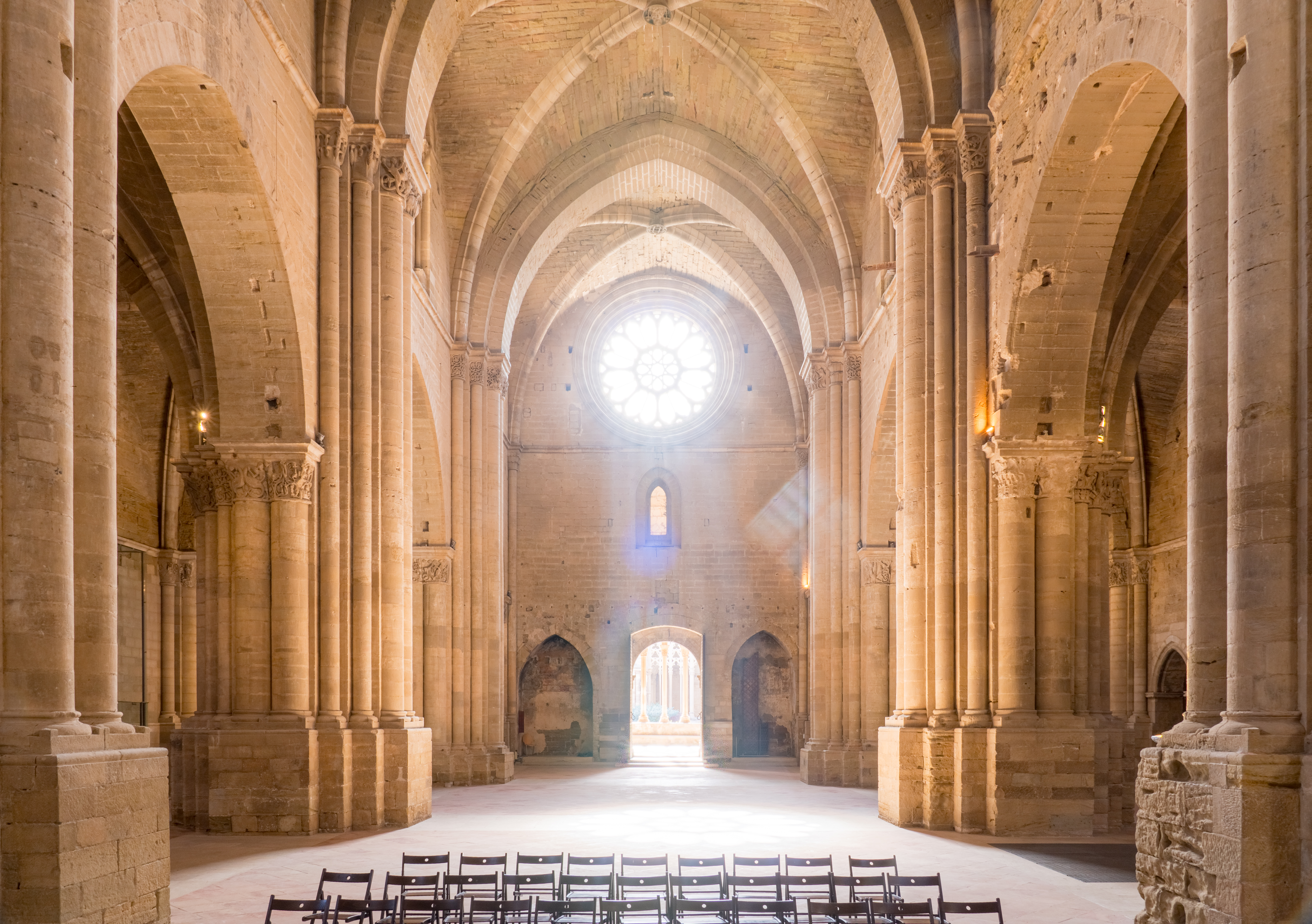
Interior

The cathedral is designed in a transitional style between Romanesque and Gothic. It lacks almost any influence of Islamic architecture. The floor plan is of a basilica in a Latin cross with a nave and two aisles. The tower is octagonal with a central space of five apses. The interior was decorated in painted murals and sculpture, much of which is still preserved, but much of which has been despoiled during the War of Spanish Succession.

The octagonal tower is 12.65 metres (41.5 ft) in diameter at its base, but 9.62 metres (31.6 ft) at the top. Its maximum height is 60.00 metres (196.85 ft) and it contains 238 steps. A bell named Mònica announces the quarter-hours and one Silvestra announces the hours. The bells are of the international Gothic style of the 15th century.

The cloister is unusually placed in front of the main entrance of the church, and is notable for both its rare opened gallery with views over the city and for its extraordinary size. In fact, this cloister has been regarded as one of the largest cloisters in Europe. This cloister has 17 ornate Gothic windows, each of them different. Among them, one could point out the Muslim window of "the palmtrees" and the central one of the westernmost wing, with a complex decoration which includes both a King David's Star and a Christian cross.

== Gallery ==
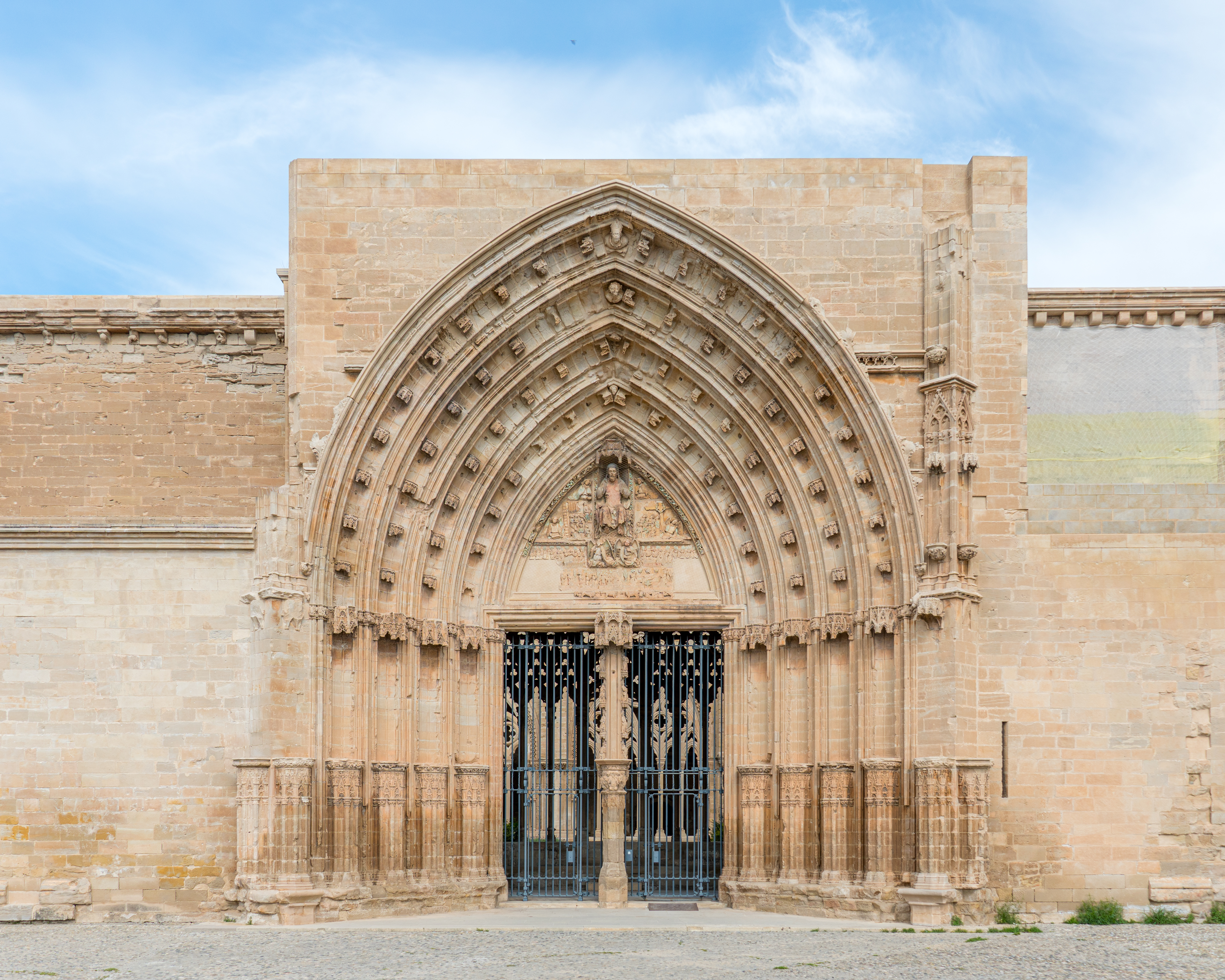
Portal of the Apostles

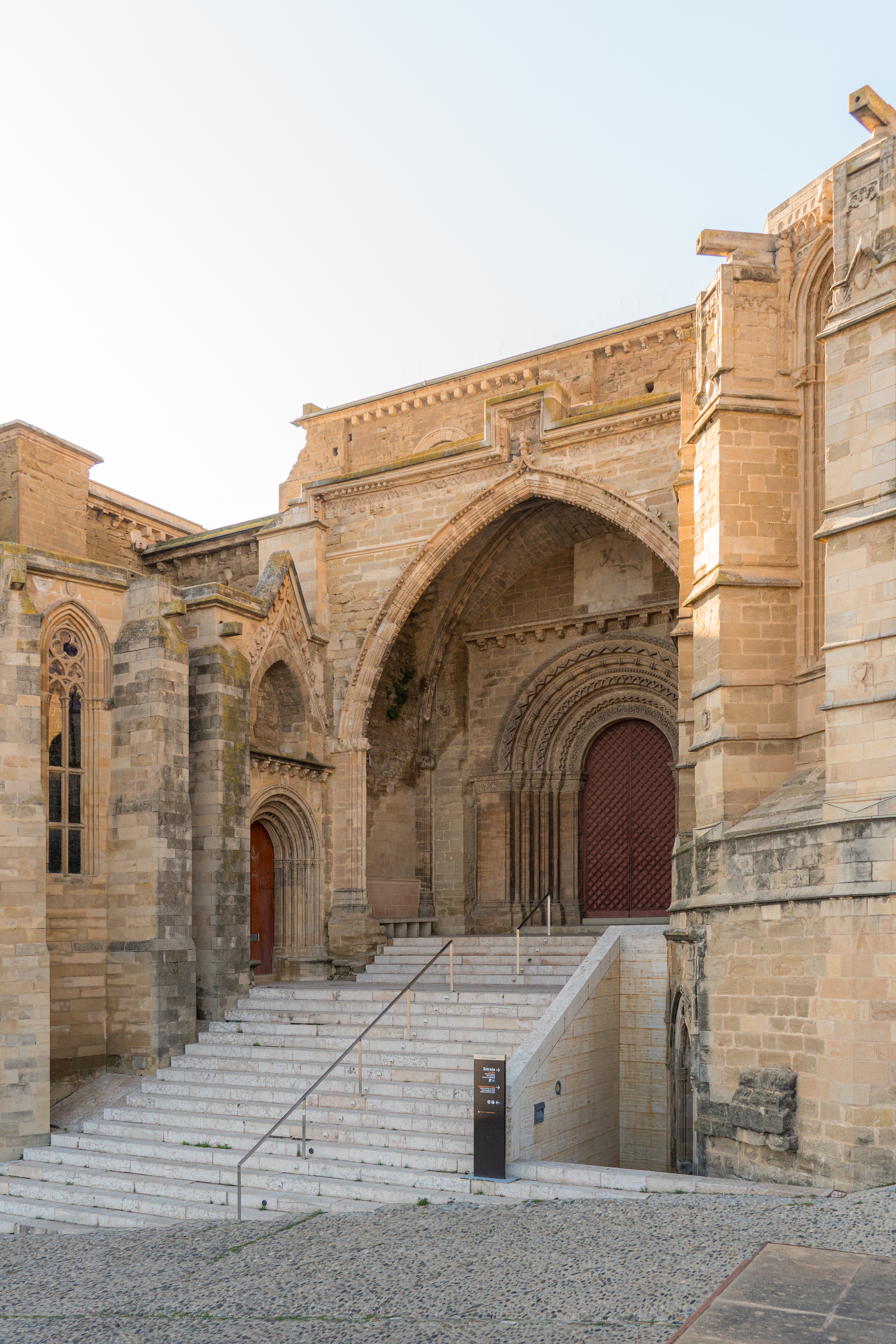
Portal of the Godchildren

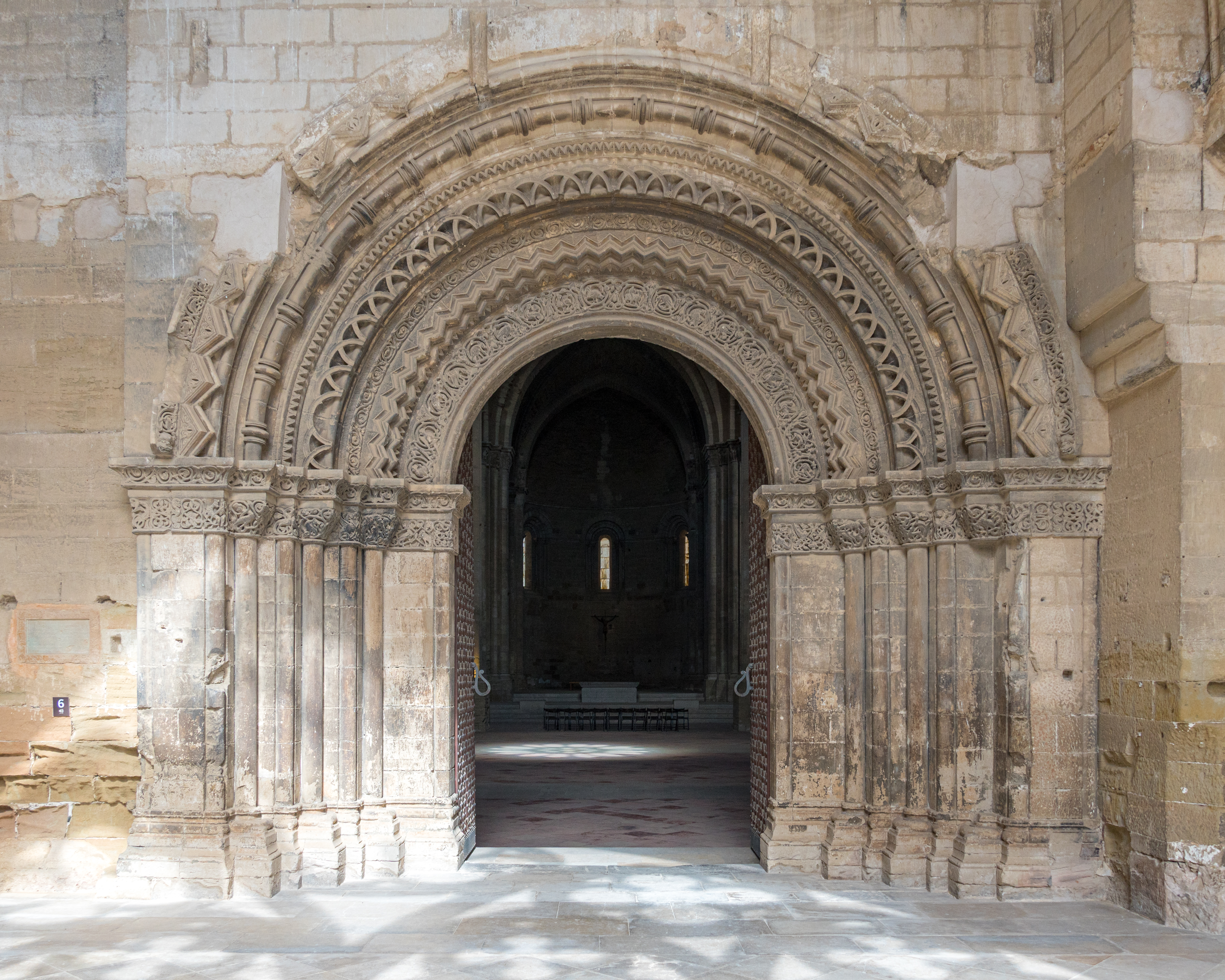
Romanesque-style portal in the cloister

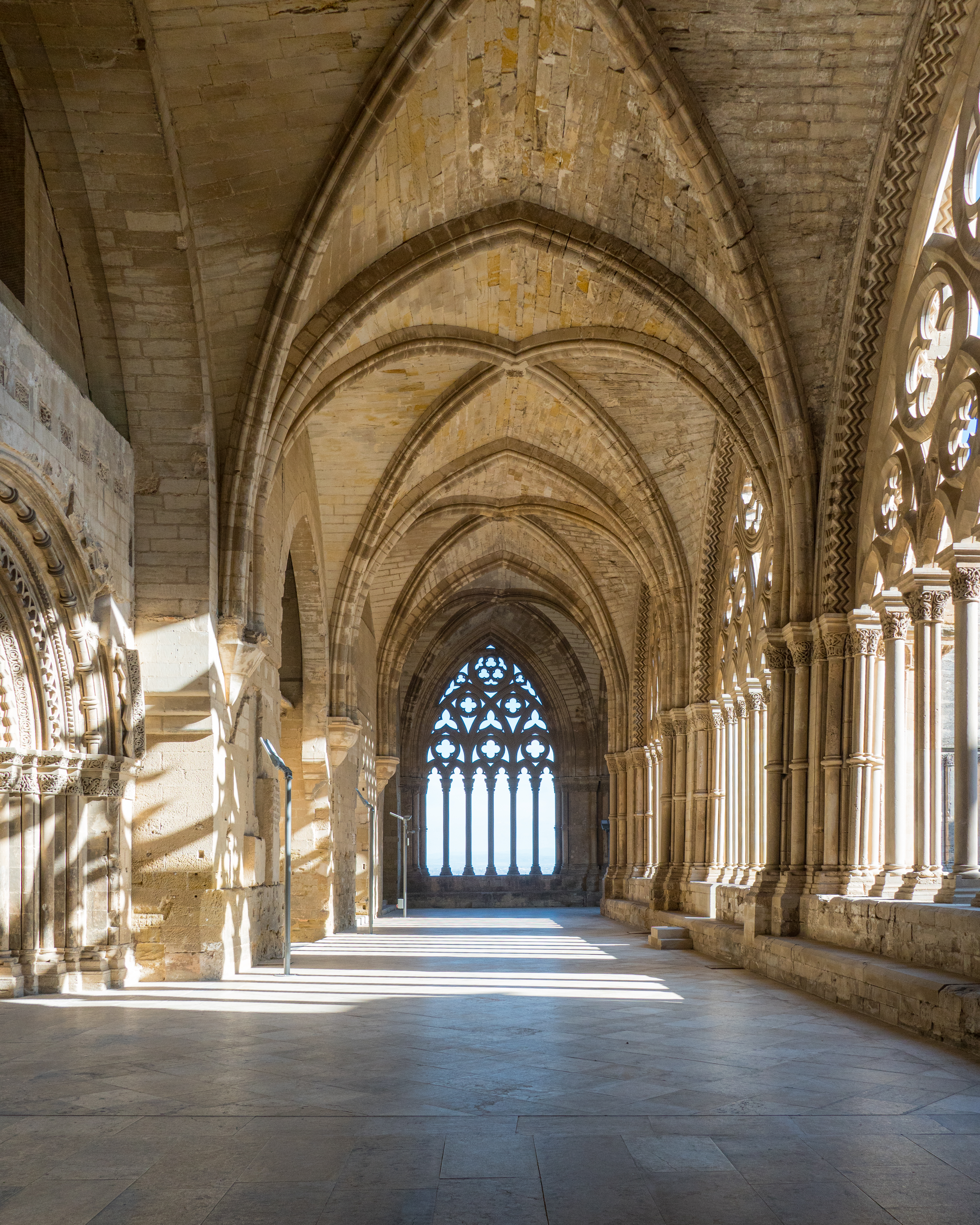
Cloister

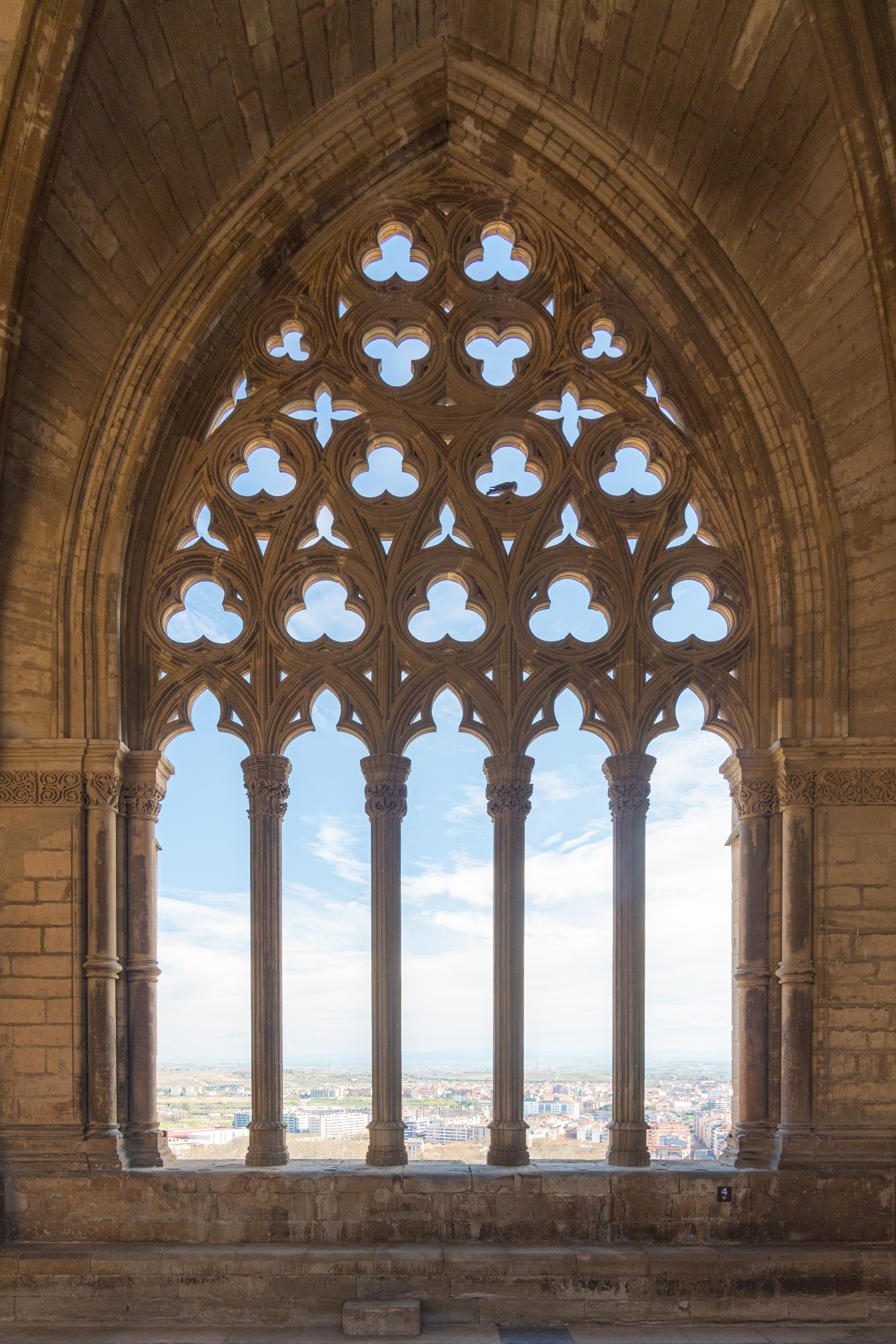
Cloister window, overlooking the city

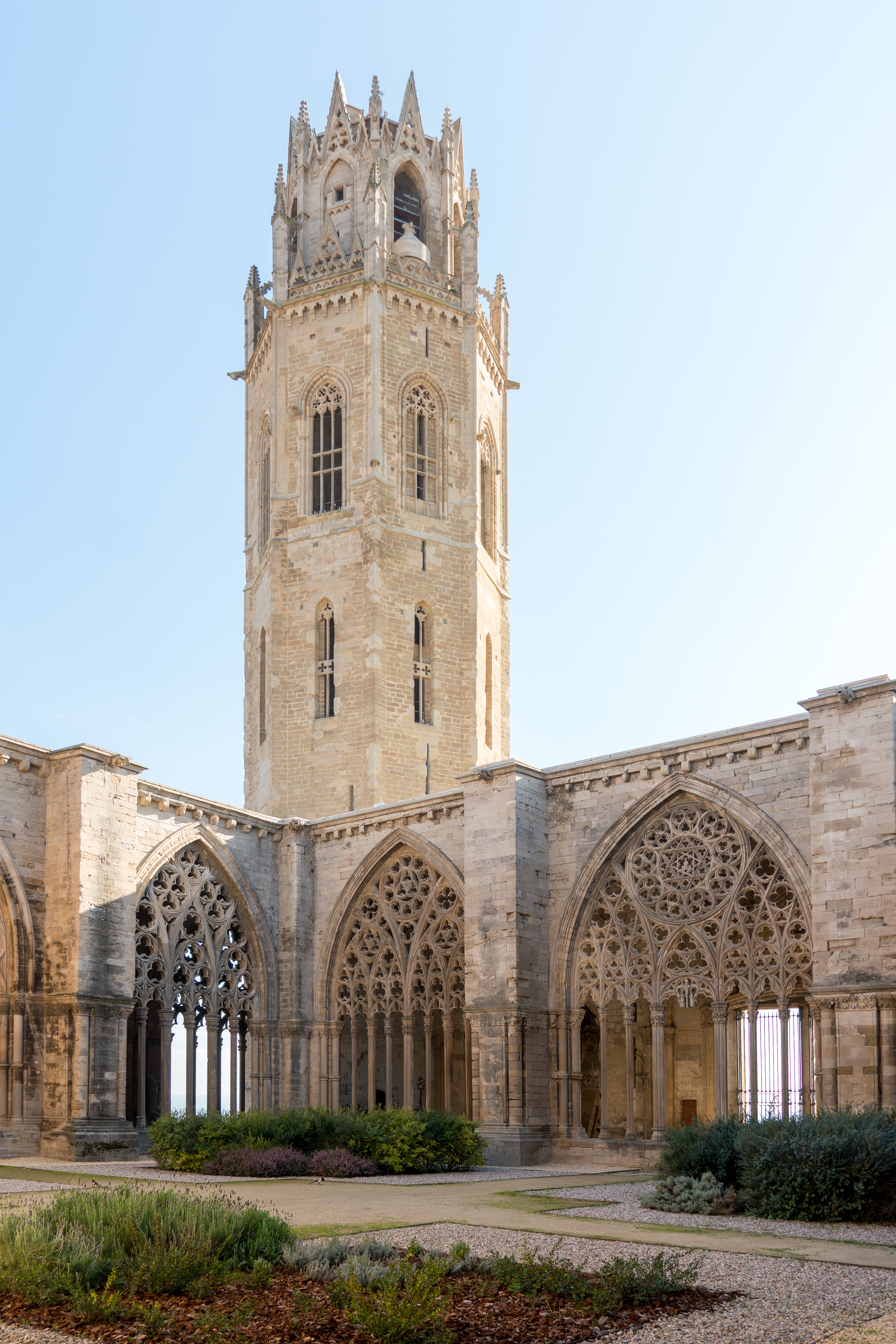
Cloister and tower

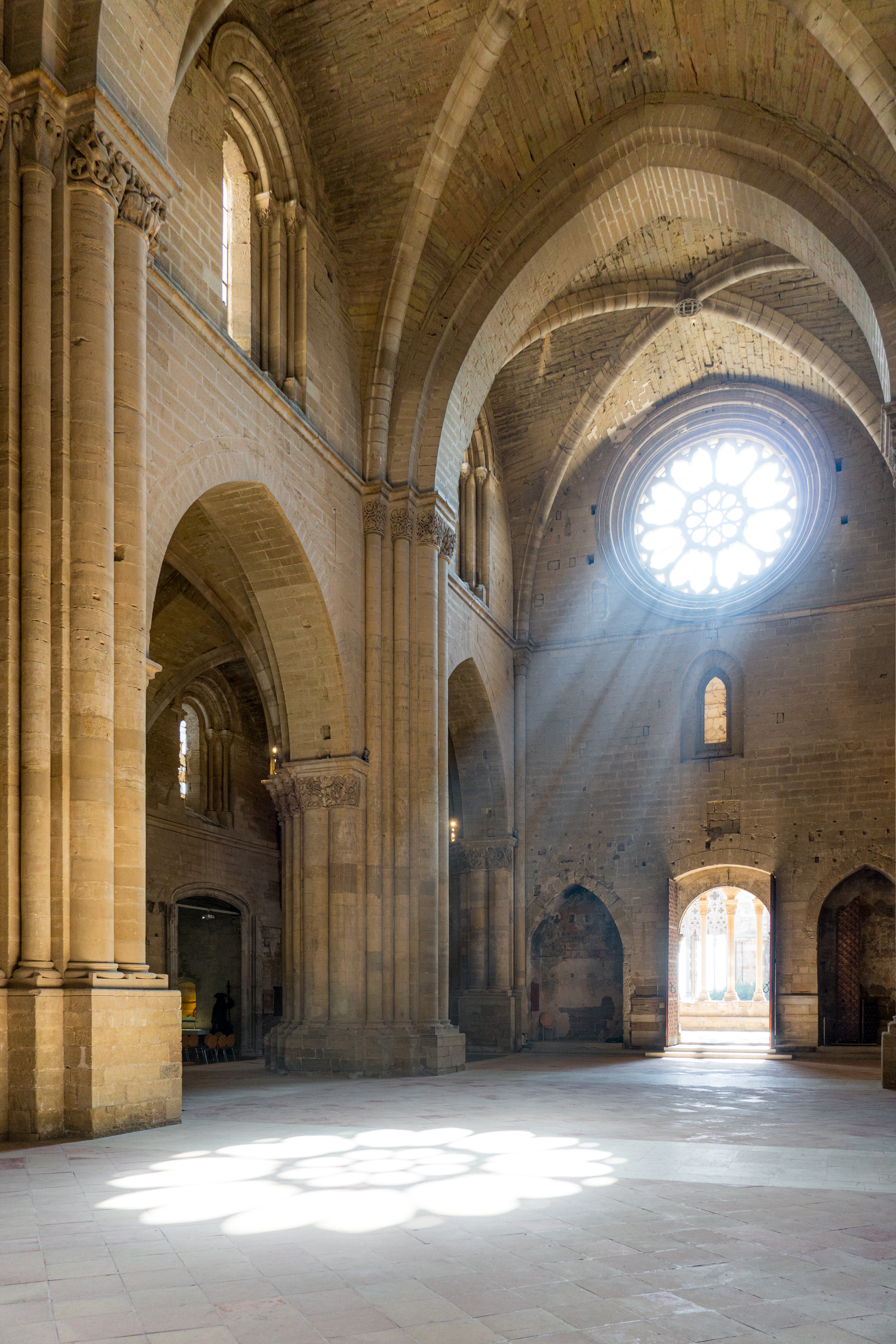
Interior

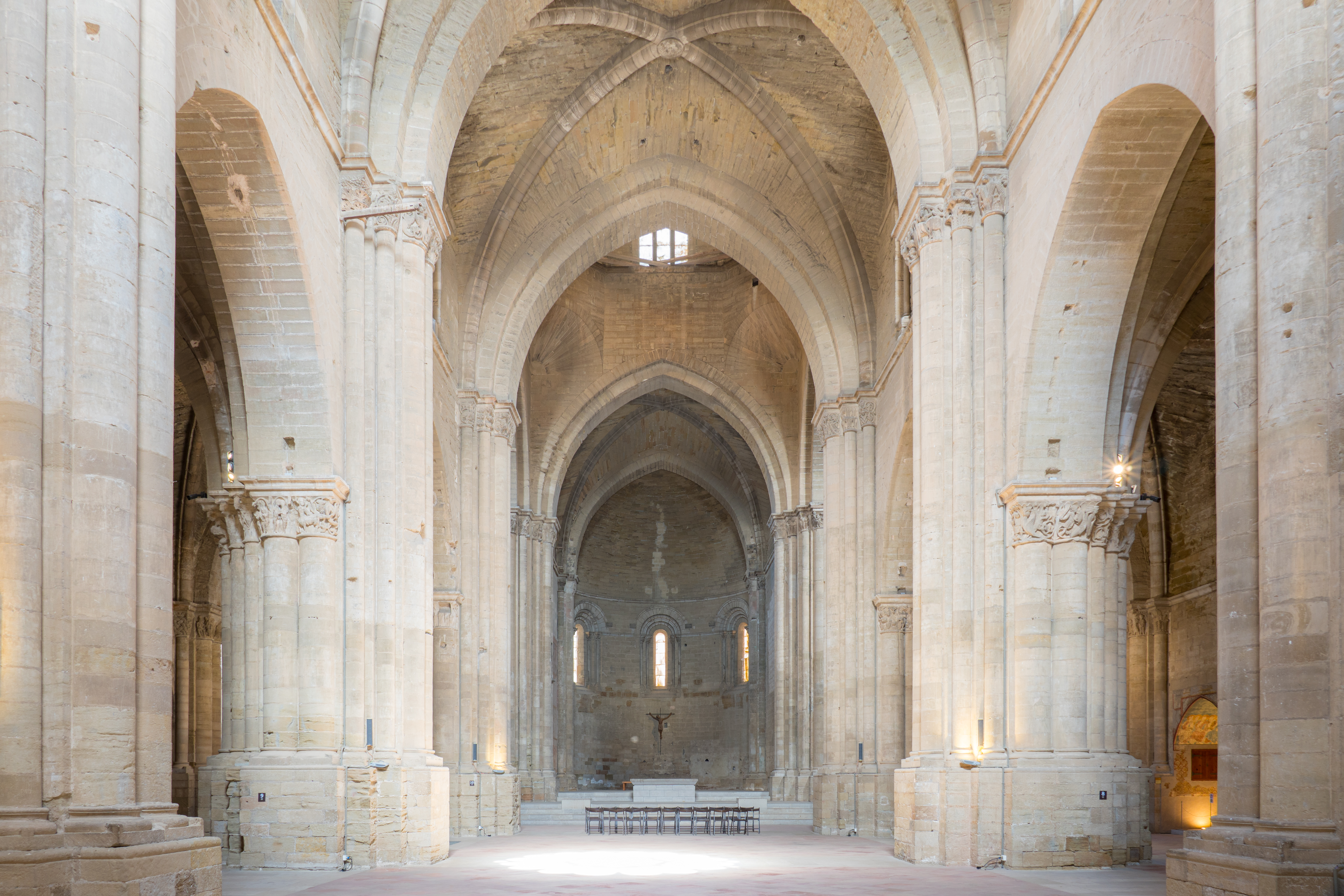
Interior

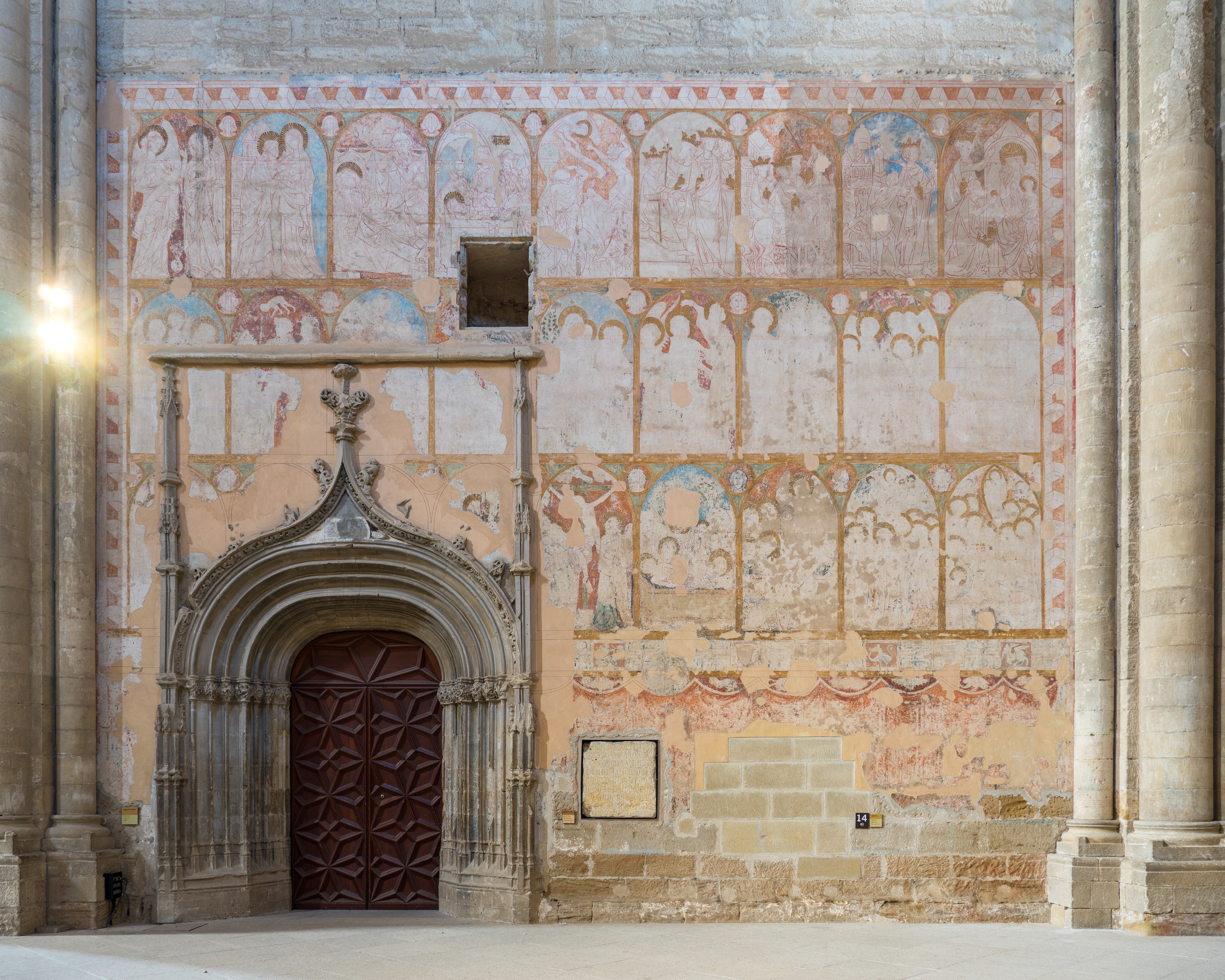
Surviving al fresco paintings

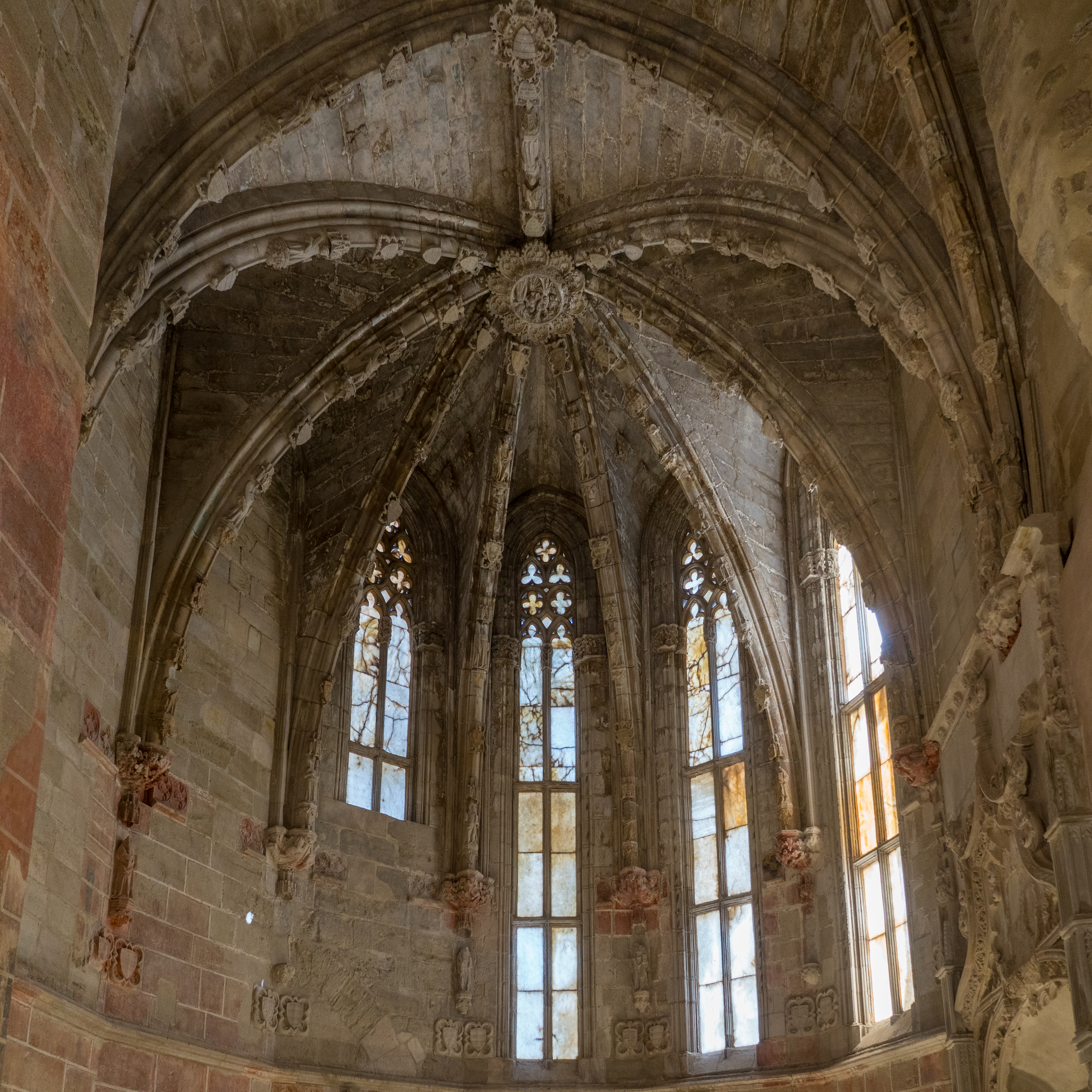
Chapel of Bishop Requesens
