= Gardeny Castle =

Ruined castle in Lleida, Spain

Coordinates: 41.6086°N 0.6149°E

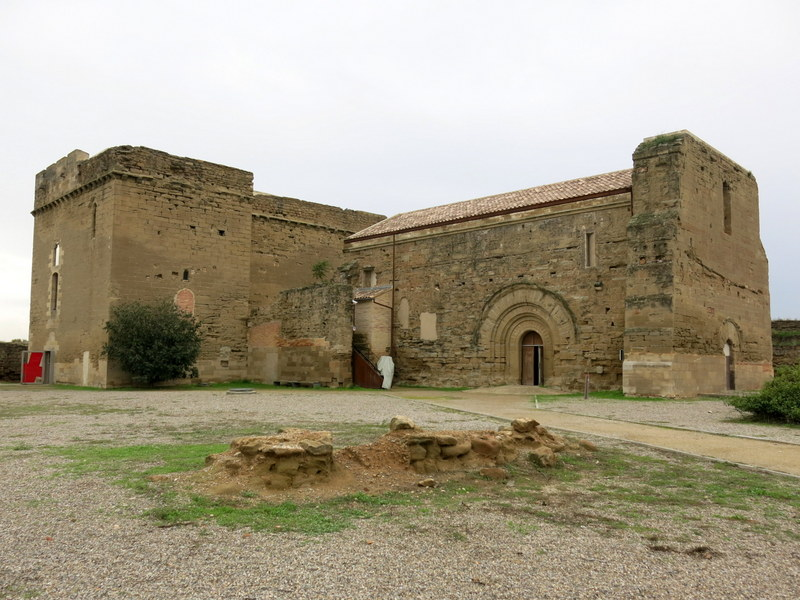
View of the remains of the castle (palace building) and the church from the courtyard (2014)

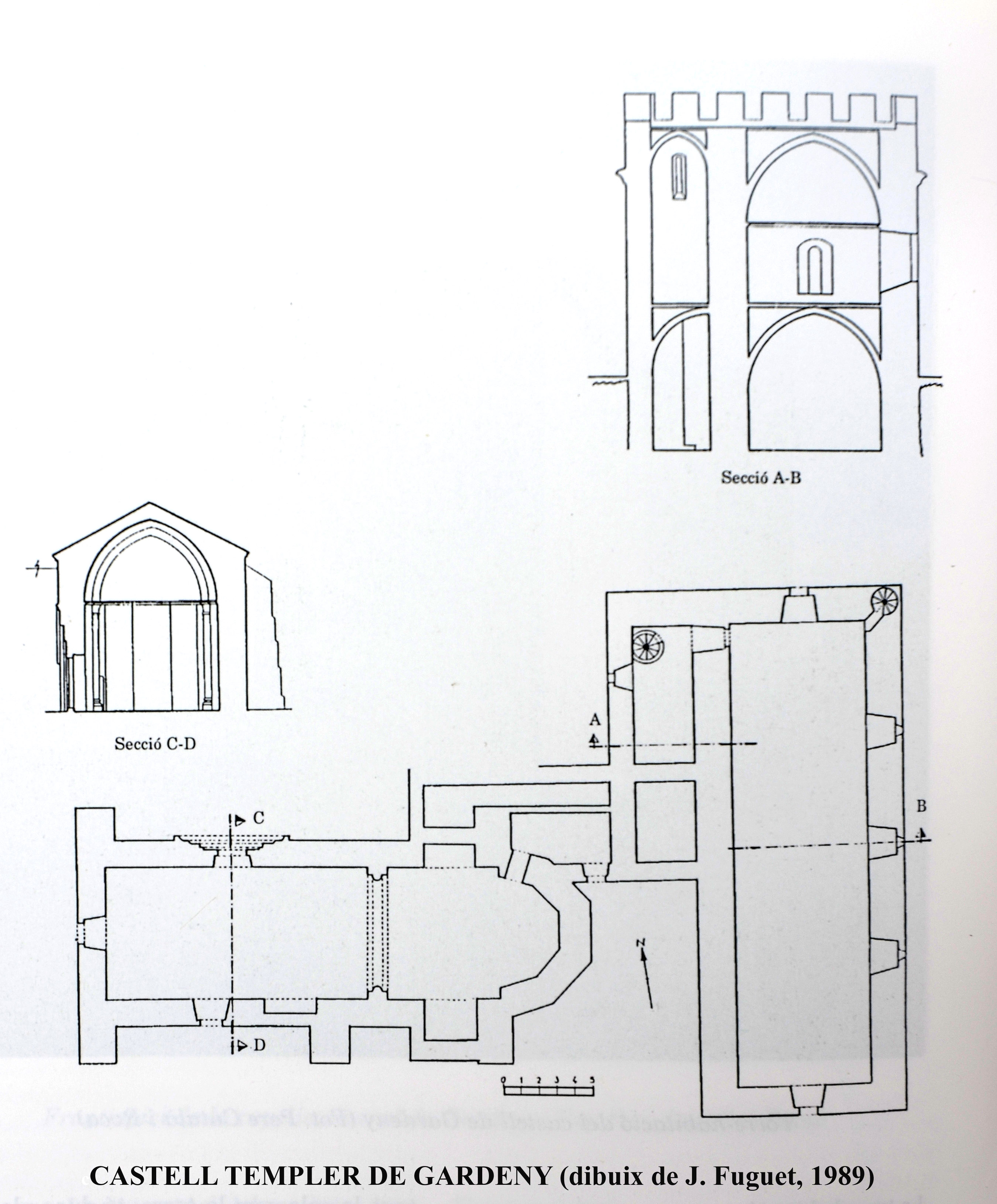
Buildings, plan and section of the castle and the church (1989)

Gardeny Castle (Castell de Gardeny) is a 12th-century Romanesque fort built by the Knights Templar at Lleida. Located on a neighbouring hill, just over a mile away, from Lleida's main fortress, the Castle of La Suda, Gardeny defended the only accessible side of that castle. Although by the 20th century, the only buildings left standing were the palace and the church of Santa María de Gardeny, at right angles to each other, the castle grounds originally had several other buildings that were destroyed during the wars of the 17th and 18th centuries. Archaeological studies from 2005 show that the palace and church were originally constructed as two separate buildings, later joined by a corridor or sacristy.

François Collignon's contemporary (after 1647 but before 1687) middle oblique view of the start of the siege of Lleida (1647) shows, among other details, the location of Gardeny in relation to the citadel—containing Lleida's principal castle, the old cathedral and the bishop's palace—within the city walls.

In the 19th century, at the time of Suchet's siege of the Lleida and its two castles, La Suda and Gardeny, the area also had the two strong fortifications of San Fernando and Pilar.

== History ==
Although there is no documentary evidence of Gardeny from Islamic times, it seems likely that there had been some kind of Andalusian fortress at that location at some moment. It is, however, documented that Alfonso the Battler had fortified the hill in 1123, although he later abandoned it. No trace of that fortress remains.

Belonging to Ermengol VI, Count of Urgell, from when he captured it in around 1147, the fort had probably been built by around 1122 under Alfonso the Battler during a previous siege on the town. Ramon Berenguer IV, Count of Barcelona likely stayed there in 1149 during his successful seven-month siege.

During the Reapers' War and the War of the Spanish Succession, some buildings from the Templar (12th-14th centuries) and Hospitaller (14th-17th centuries) eras were demolished and other medieval fortifications were modified, including surrounding the complex with Vaubanian bastions, a double enclosure and adding a mock barbican.
