= Miguel de Lili =

Spanish army officer (1756–1818)

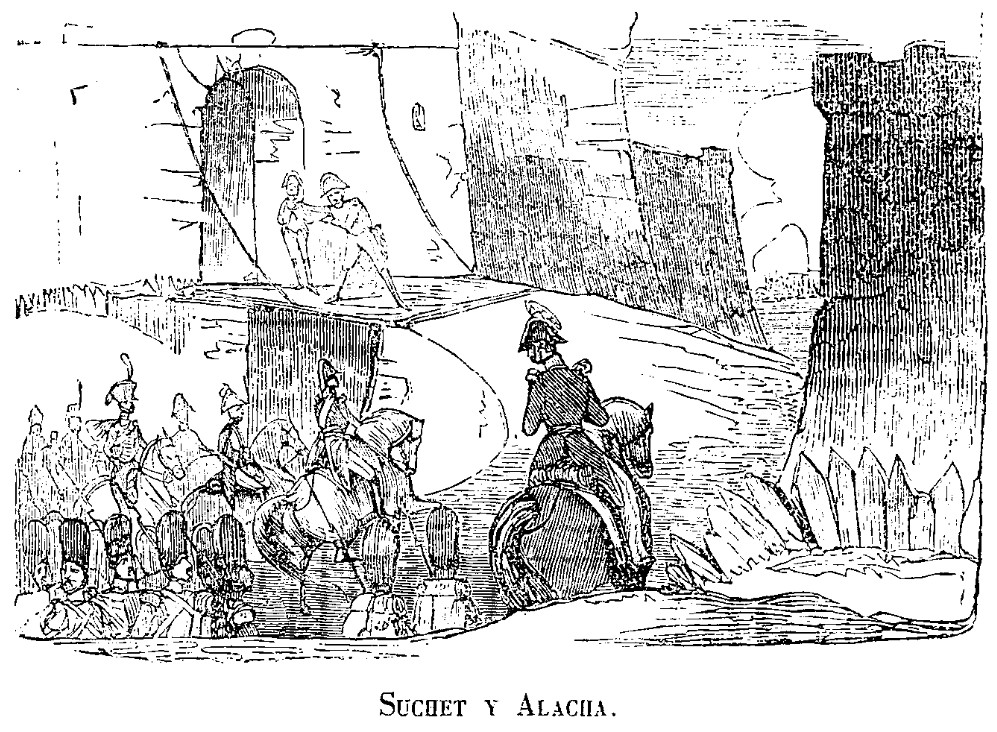
- Souchet and Alacha during the siege of Tortosa in 1811 (1847 Spanish illustration)
- Born: c. 1756; Cestona (Guipúzcoa)
- Died: 14 October 1818 (aged 61–62) Madrid
- Conflicts: American Revolutionary War; Great Siege of Gibraltar; War of the Pyrenees; First Battle of Boulou; Siege of Collioure (1794); War of the Oranges; Invasion of Portugal (1807); Peninsular War; Battle of Tudela; Battle of Ciudad Real; Siege of Tortosa (1810–1811)

Miguel de Lili e Idiáquez, 9th Count of Alacha (c. 1756 – 14 October 1818), was a Spanish military officer who served during the Peninsular War, among other military campaigns. Most historians, including the Count of Toreno, Arteche, Oman (who spells his name Lilli), etc., consider Lili's capitulation to General Suchet at the Siege of Tortosa (1810–1811) weak-spirited and unnecessary.

== Early career ==
Having enlisted as a cadet in the Royal Guards Regiment in 1769, Lili saw active service as a Grenadier cadet at the Great Siege of Gibraltar from June 1779 to February 1783 and volunteering to man one of the floating batteries, on which he was badly wounded in the leg.

During the War of the Pyrenees, he took part in several combats, including at Boulou, in October 1793. In 1794, he was captured at Siege of Collioure (1794).

Promoted to Fusilier captain in 1795, he fought in Portugal during the War of the Oranges (1801).

== Peninsular War ==
He again saw action in Portugal, this time under Francisco Solano, 2nd Marquis de Socorro, who led one of the three auxiliary Spanish corps sent to aid General Junot's Invasion of Portugal (1807).

Lili was then given command of two battalions of General Manuel Lapeña's division. Following the rout of Duke of Bailén's Army of the Centre at the Battle of Tudela (November 1808), Count Alacha "won some credit" for managing to avoid being intercepted by the French divisions around him after having become separated from the main body, and bringing his brigade intact to Cuenca, where the Duke of the Infantado, now commander in chief of that army, was camped.

Following the defeat of the Army of the Centre, now commanded by Cartaojal, at the Battle of Ciudad Real, Lili formed the rearguard escorting the retreating Artillery.

In June 1809, he was promoted to Infantry brigadier and appointed second in command of the 5th Division, post from which he resigned due to illness. Once recovered, in 1810 he was given command of the 1st Section of the 2nd Division, and took three battalions from Lorca, in Murcia, to Chirivel, in Andalusia. That March, he was promoted to commander of the 3rd Battalion of the Royal Guards and appointed governor of the garrison at Tortosa, in Catalonia. At the siege there, he was wounded in the leg during a sortie and finally surrendered the place, along with its garrison of some 7,000–9,000 men, to General Suchet in January 1811. Taken prisoner to France, that same month Lili was convicted in absentia for treason because of the capitulation and his image was beheaded in public.

Having managed to escape from captivity, he managed to reach Dijon at the beginning of 1814 and from there to Spain, where he was again put on trial, in August 1814, and absolved, being re-instated to his prior rank of field marshal.
