= Cafè del Teatre de l'Escorxador =

Coordinates: 41°36′45″N 0°36′58″E

Cafè del Teatre de l'Escorxador, or Cafè del Teatre for short, is a concert venue in Lleida (Catalonia, Spain) opened as an addition to the Teatre Municipal de l'Escorxador. Its address is Carrer de Roca Labrador 4 bis. Among its recurrent events are Cafècurt, monthly short-film screening sessions, some activities of the Lleida Latin-American Film Festival, jam sessions and other live shows, especially jazz-oriented music and rock.

== See also ==
- Culture in Lleida
