= Teatre Municipal de l'Escorxador =

Coordinates: 41°36′45″N 0°36′59″E

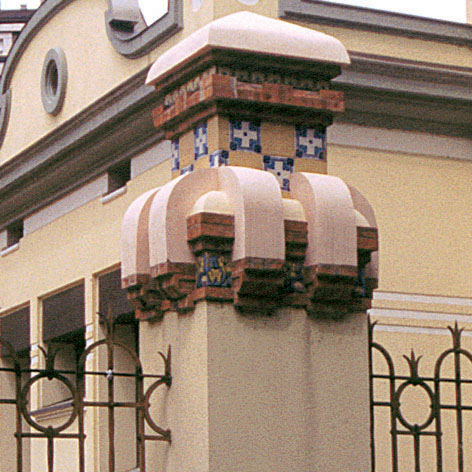
Detail of the main building, note the decoration.

Teatre Municipal de l'Escorxador (Catalan for Slaughterhouse Theatre) is a theatre on carrer de Lluís Companys, in the Templers-Instituts quarter of Lleida, Catalonia, Spain. It's remarkable for its striking modernista-Art Nouveau architecture, unusual for a former slaughterhouse, a work by the Tarragona-born architect Francesc de Paula Morera i Gatell, nowadays refurbished and complete with some 1990s additions. It was heavily damaged during the Spanish Civil War bombings. It has been in operation since 1998, and is owned by the Lleida city council. It has two stages: Sala 1, an Italian-style hall with 310 seats, and Sala 2, used for plays and performances of a more experimental sort. There's a third space located in the former convent of Saint Theresa. Next to it is the Cafè del Teatre.

== Theatre school ==
The Aula Municipal del Teatre de Lleida is a publicly operated theatre school comprising courses both aimed at children and adults, including Studies in Dramatic Art, and a member of the Associació Catalana d'Escoles de Teatre (ACET). La Inestable 21 is the young people's theatre company of the school.

== See also ==
- Culture in Lleida
