= Siege of Lérida =

1810 siege during the Peninsular War

Siege of Lérida (1810)
- Part of Peninsular War
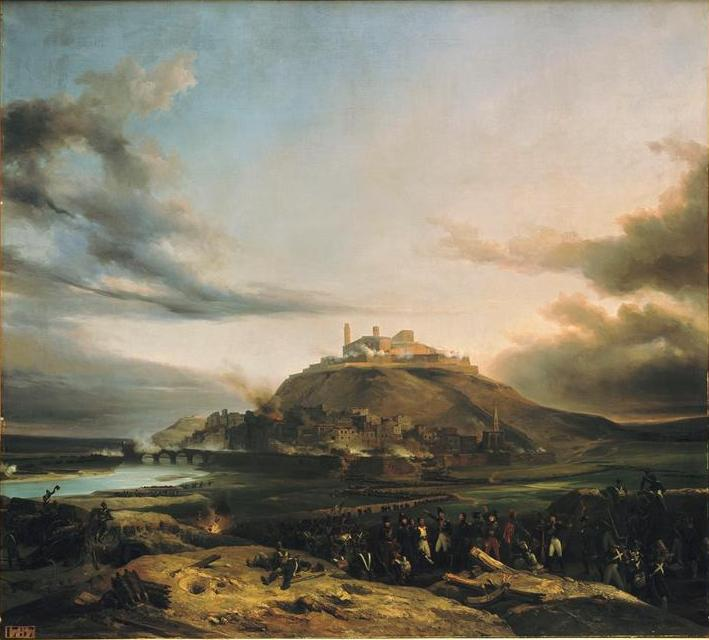
- Siege of Lérida, 14 May 1810 by Jean-Charles-Joseph Rémond, 1836
| Date | 23 April and 29 April to 14 May 1810 |
| Location | Lleida (Lérida), Spain 41.6139°N 0.6256°E |
| Result | French victory |

Belligerents
| (France) First French Empire | Kingdom of Spain |

Commanders and leaders
| (France) Louis Gabriel Suchet | (Spain) Jaime García Conde (Spain) Henry O'Donnell |

Strength
| 13,000 | 9,000 |

Casualties and losses
| Lérida: 1,000; Margalef: 100–120 | Lérida: 9,000; Margalef: 3,000, 3 guns |

Peninsular War: Aragón Catalonia
current battle

In the siege of Lérida from 29 April to 13 May 1810, an Imperial French army under General Suchet besieged a Spanish garrison led by Major General García Conde. On 13 May, García Conde surrendered with his 7,000 surviving soldiers. Lleida (Lérida) is a city in the western part of Catalonia. Margalef is located about 10 kilometres (6 mi) southeast of Lérida. The siege occurred during the Peninsular War, part of the Napoleonic Wars.

After a fruitless attempt to seize Valencia in March, Suchet determined to move against Lérida. By mid-April, the French were before the city. Suchet heard that a Spanish army commanded by Henry O'Donnell was trying to interfere with the planned operation. O'Donnell's column was intercepted and, at the Battle of Margalef on 23 April, it was routed with heavy losses. This action was followed by a siege in which Suchet used brutal methods to bring a speedy surrender. On 13 May, García Conde capitulated with his 7,000 surviving soldiers. This event was the start of a series of successful sieges from 1810 to 1812 in which Suchet's troops seemed to be unstoppable.

== Background ==
In January 1810, General of Division Louis Gabriel Suchet commanded the French III Corps, with three infantry divisions commanded by Generals of Division Anne-Gilbert Laval and Louis François Félix Musnier, and General of Brigade Pierre-Joseph Habert. Laval's 1st Division consisted of 4,290 effectives in six battalions, Musnier's 2nd Division counted 7,173 men in 11 battalions, and Habert's 3rd Division numbered 4,329 soldiers in seven battalions. General of Brigade André Joseph Boussart led the 1,899 troopers of the corps cavalry brigade. These were divided into two unusually strong regiments, one heavy and one light. The III Corps also had 1,287 gunners, sappers, and other attached troops. Suchet's total of 23,140 effectives included 4,162 soldiers in garrisons, La Val, Musnier, Habert, and Boussart. The source provides the full names and ranks of the generals.

That month, Suchet planned to move against the Spanish-held cities of Lérida and Mequinenza. However, he received positive orders to move directly against Valencia instead. King Joseph Bonaparte was in the process of overrunning Andalusia and believed that the Spanish armies were on the verge of collapse. Suchet reluctantly obeyed the king's command and his army reached the outskirts of Valencia on 6 March. Lacking siege artillery and facing a determined set of defenders, the French general retreated after blockading the city for only four days. Back in his base in Aragon, Suchet spent a few weeks suppressing Spanish guerillas before he was ready to march on Lérida.

Suchet's army arrived in front of Lérida on 15 April. The 13,000 French soldiers were organized into 18 battalions and eight squadrons and supplied with 30 artillery pieces. Musnier's 2nd Division included three battalions each of the 114th, 115th, and 121st Line Infantry Regiments, two battalions of the 1st Legion of the Vistula, and two foot artillery batteries. Habert's 3rd Division comprised two battalions each of the 5th Light and 116th Line, three battalions of the 117th Line, and two foot artillery batteries. Boussart's cavalry was made up of the 4th Hussar and 13th Cuirassier Regiments, and a horse artillery battery. The fortress of Lérida was armed with 105 cannons. Major General Jaime García Conde led the 8,000 Spanish defenders, including 350 gunners. In September 1809, García Conde successfully led a 4,000-man re-supply convoy during the Siege of Gerona. During the operation he broke through the Italian defenders and delivered supplies and reinforcements before escaping.

== Battle of Margalef ==
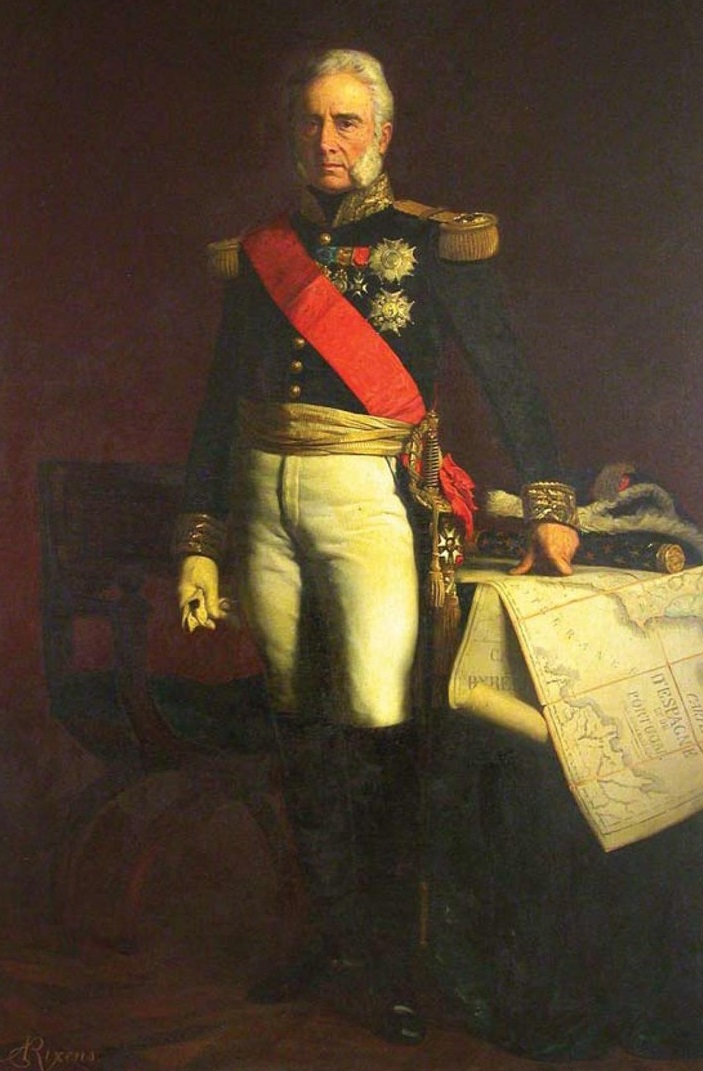
Jean Isidore Harispe

While Suchet was preparing to invest Lérida, he received intelligence that a relief column was heading towards the city. Determined to intercept this force, Suchet set out with Musnier's division. After hours of futile searching, the French turned back toward Lérida and bivouacked 3 miles (5 km) from the city on the evening of 22 April. Unknown to Suchet, Major General Henry O'Donnell's relief army had camped nearby. The Spanish force had as many as 8,000 or as few as 7,000 troops, including 300 cavalry and six cannons. Musnier's division had all of its components except the 121st Line and numbered 5,500 men. In addition, there were 500 troopers of the 4th Hussars and 13th Cuirassiers.

On 23 April, O'Donnell's lead division under Major General Miguel Ibarrola González bumped into General of Brigade Jean Isidore Harispe's small French force east of Lérida. Harispe managed to contain the numerically superior Spanish column until Musnier's division appeared on the scene. Ibarrola immediately beat a hasty retreat with Musnier in pursuit. At the hamlet of Margalef, the Spanish were attempting to fend off the French when the 13th Cuirassiers charged into their flank. Ibarrola's division disintegrated as the heavy cavalrymen slashed and hacked at the fleeing foot soldiers. Just as the butchery ended, O'Donnell showed up with his second division. The Spanish general quickly backtracked but the French cavalry were soon at his soldiers' heels. Again, the cuirassiers caught up with the Spaniards and rode down their rear guard, inflicting more casualties.

At Margalef, O'Donnell lost 500 killed and wounded. In addition, the victorious French seized 2,500 prisoners, three guns, and four colors. The French lost 100 men, all from the 13th Cuirassiers. The infantry were present, but not involved in the fighting. One account stated that 3,000 Spaniards were captured and that French losses were 120 men.

== Siege ==
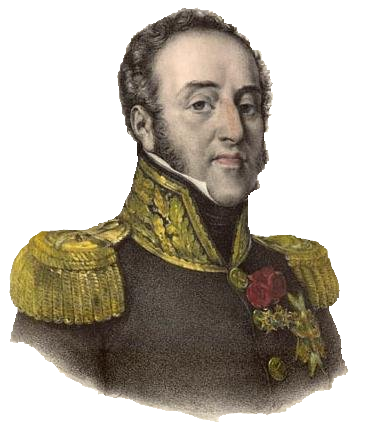
Louis Gabriel Suchet

Having disposed of O'Donnell's relief army, Suchet invested Lérida and demanded the city's surrender but García Conde refused his summons. The city lay on the west bank of the Segre River with a tête-de-pont on the east bank. A hill to the north was crowned by the citadel while Fort Garden and two redoubts were located on a hill to the south. The northern wall between the citadel and the Segre was particularly weak. Suchet posted Musnier's men and the majority of his cavalry on the east bank to watch for any relief forces. Habert's troops faced the northern and western walls on the west bank. A temporary bridge connected the two parts of the besieging corps. The formal siege began on 29 April. Suchet brought up his siege train and on 7 May had a battery of heavy cannons in action.

Lérida's defenses proved no match for Suchet's artillery. The French guns took the Carmen and Magdelena bastions under fire, causing serious damage. Within six days, the siege cannons battered a breach in the wall. Meanwhile, the French attacked the forts on the southern hill. After one repulse, the French overran the two redoubts on the night of 12–13 May. Late on 13 May, assault columns rushed the breach and seized it. The defenders had built a new line behind the breach, but the French overcame these defenses also. At this, García Conde ordered his soldiers to withdraw into the citadel.

Showing no moral scruples, Suchet ordered his soldiers to drive the civilian population under the castle's walls. Any person who resisted was instantly murdered by the French soldiers. After the Spanish commander admitted the non-combatants into the citadel, the French began a high-angle bombardment of the castle, using howitzers and mortars. These killed most of the 500 civilians who died during the siege. Horrified at the slaughter as bursting shells struck down soldiers and civilians alike, García Conde asked for terms at noon on 14 May. The surrender netted 7,000 Spanish soldiers as prisoners. During the siege, the Spanish garrison suffered 1,700 killed and wounded. Among the French trophies were six generals, 307 officers, and 105 artillery pieces. French casualties numbered about 1,000 killed and wounded.

== Aftermath ==
The seizure of Lérida was the beginning of a remarkable series of successful sieges by Suchet's apparently invincible army. The III Corps began the Siege of Mequinenza on 15 May 1810 and the place fell on 5 June. The Siege of Tortosa ended on 2 January 1811 when General Miguel de Lili, the Count of Alacha, capitulated with 3,974 survivors, 182 guns, and nine colors. Suchet followed this success with the Siege of Tarragona. After a climactic assault on 28 June, Lieutenant General Juan Senen de Contreras was captured and his large garrison was annihilated. For this victory, Emperor Napoleon I made Suchet a Marshal of France.

Immediately after Suchet's triumph at the Battle of Saguntum on 25 October 1811, the fortress of Sagunto (Saguntum) surrendered. This was followed by Suchet's greatest coup of all. The Siege of Valencia ended when Captain General Joaquin Blake y Joyes capitulated with 16,270 men on 9 January 1812. Soon afterward, the fortresses of Dénia and Peniscola submitted to the French, making Suchet the master of the province of Valencia.
