= High Aragon =

Coordinates: 42.5803°N 0.0714°W

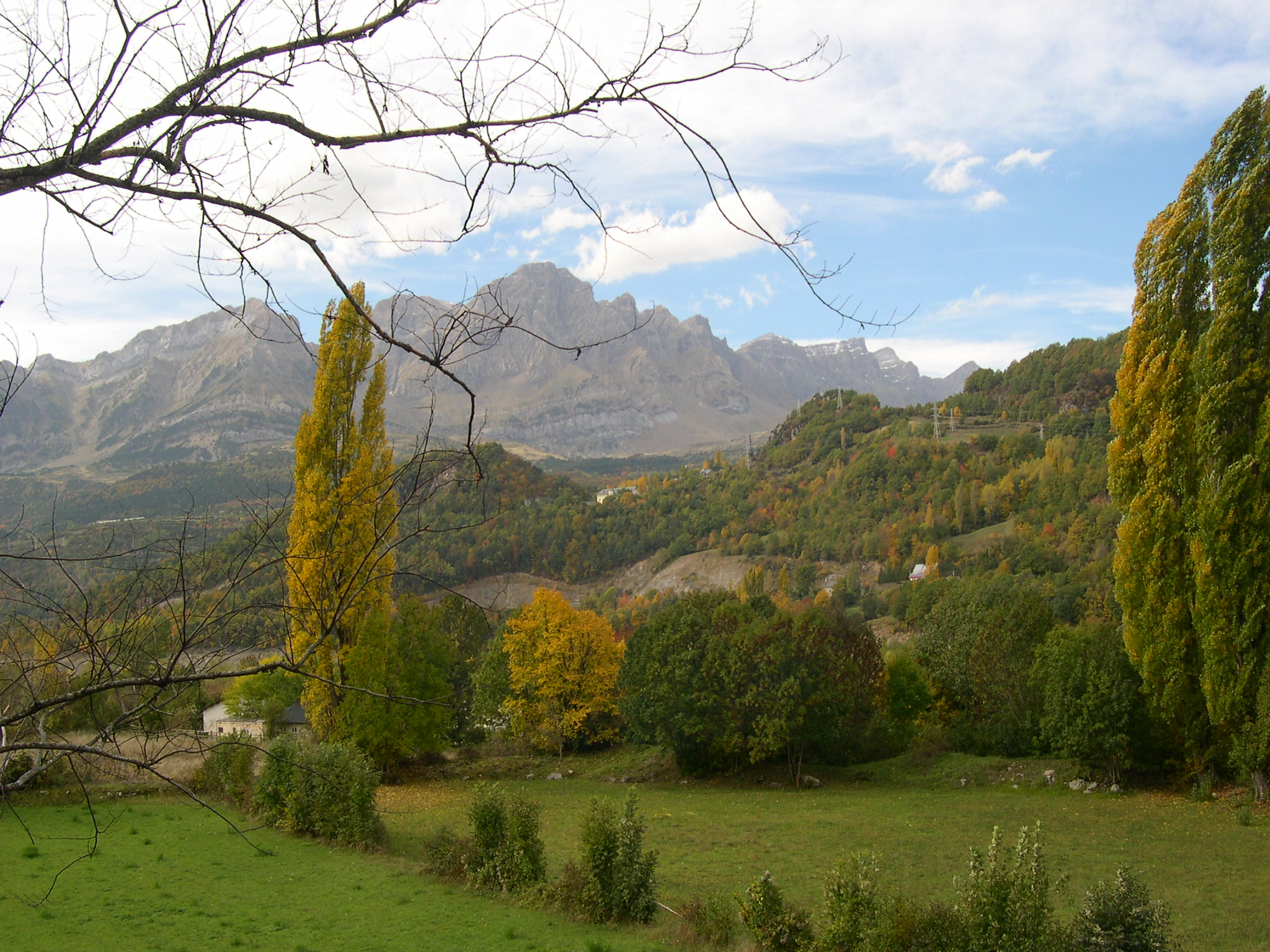
Tena Valley, one of the valleys in Alto Aragon

Alto Aragón (literally, Upper Aragon or Highlands of Aragon in English; compare Upper Navarre, Upper Rioja) is the northernmost territories or highlands of Aragon, flanking the Pyrenees and includes the Aneto Mountain, the highest peak in the entire Pyrenean chain. The term Alto Aragón, or highlands, is used to contrast with the Bajo Aragón, referring to the lowlands or flat plains of Aragon which roughly begins around the Somontano county of Huesca stretching south to the Ebro river basin.

The term Alto Aragon is also used interchangeably to refer to the Province of Huesca when speaking of northern Aragon.

The Alto Aragón or Highlands of Aragon are, historically and geographically, made up of the original independent counties of the Frankish Marca Hispanica, that would later expand to form the medieval Kingdom of Aragon.

Usually used in a cultural context, the term Alto Aragón, when referring to "the Highlands", conveys a sense of cultural character - of noble, fiercely independent, Pyrenean mountain people: of mythic heroes, legends, Templars and crusades. This strength of character is reflected in its architecture, mountain top villages, its robust cuisine, distinctive traditional clothing (now worn only in festivals, such as in Ansó), folk music and dancing, and most especially, in its language.

The Aragonese language was born in the Alto Aragón, the highlands, and today this is where it continues to be spoken most actively, by over 10,000 people.

== See also ==
- Lower Aragon
