= Narciso Codina =

Spanish businessman and sports leader (1932–2020)

- Born: Narcís Codina i Surós; 1 May 1932; Maçanet de la Selva, Spain
- Died: 14 March 2020 (aged 87); Alicante, Spain
- Citizenship: Spanish
- Known for: 15th President of Girona FC

15th President of Girona FC
- In office 1968–1973
- Preceded by: Pere Saguer Burjó
- Succeeded by: Mauricio Duran García

Narciso Codina Surós (1 May 1932 – 14 March 2020) was a Spanish businessman and sports leader who served as the 15th president of Girona FC between 1968 and 1973.

== Early and personal life ==
Born in the Girona municipality of Maçanet de la Selva on 1 May 1932, Codina married and had 4 children, 11 grandchildren, and 3 great-grandchildren.

== Business career ==
In 1962, Codina founded Assessoria Codina, a consulting firm in Girona which is currently a second-generation family business with more than 60 employees. He also founded the Medplaya hotel chain, which had establishments throughout the Costa del Sol and Costa Brava in Catalonia, Valencia, and Andalusia. In November 2015, the Association of Hoteliers of the Costa del Sol (Aehcos) gave two awards to Med Playa Hotels.

== Presidency of Girona ==
In 1968, the 36-year-old Codina was elected as the 15th president of Girona FC, a position that he held for five years, until 1973. During this period, he was the driving force behind several significant initiatives, such as the construction of the Estadi Montilivi, which was inaugurated in July 1970, and the Trofeo Costa Brava, which held its first edition in August 1970. Montilivi thus became the new venue for Girona's matches, replacing the Camp de Vista Alegre, whose owner wanted to recover it. Under his leadership, Girona contested two promotions to the Segunda División in 1971 and 1973, but lost both of them to Villarreal and Córdoba, respectively.

Between 1977 and 1979, Codina presided over the Association of Real Estate Agents, and between 1978 and 1980, he was a provincial delegate of the Superior Sports Council, and then a councilor for UCD in the Girona City Council in 1980–81.
