= Jaime García Conde =

Spanish military commander

- Born: 4 January 1767; Barcelona, Spain
- Died: 27 May 1820 (aged 53) Madrid, Spain
- Rank: Field marshal
- Conflicts: American Revolutionary War; Great Siege of Gibraltar; War of the Pyrenees; Peninsular War; Battle of Valls; Third siege of Girona; Siege of Lérida

Jaime García Conde (1767–1820) was a Spanish military commander.

== Early career ==
García Conde joined the Regiment of the Spanish Royal Guard as a cadet in July 1779, and participated at the Great Siege of Gibraltar.

He was promoted to alférez in September 1787 and to second lieutenant of Fusiliers in June 1791. At the outbreak of the War of the Pyrenees he was sent to the Army of Rosellón, where he distinguished himself at the attack on the battery at Banyuls-dels-Aspres (December 1793), for which he was promoted to lieutenant colonel a few days later.

In October 1802, García Conde was promoted to colonel and appointed captain of Fusiliers of the 1st Battalion early the following year.

== Peninsular War ==
Shortly after the outbreak of the war, the Junta de Extremadura promoted García Conde to Infantry brigadier, in July 1808 and to field marshal the following September. In November 1808, he was transferred to the Army of Catalonia, and promoted to major general.

There, he was given command of the Reserve division, based at the recently appointed captain-general of Catalonia, Juan Miguel de Vives's newly established headquarters at Martorell, and which comprised 777 line infantry, 80 hussars and four cannon.

On 25 February 1809, García Conde fought at the Battle of Valls and on 1 September that year, at the head of 4,000 troops and 500 horse, he successfully escorted a convoy of over a thousand mules laden with provisions, as well as a herd of cattle into a besieged Gerona. To do so, his column had routed Lecchi's Italian division, that day commanded by Brigadier Milosewitz, that was besieging the garrison.

On 14 May 1810, García Conde, then commanding officer of the garrison at Lérida, surrendered the citadel, with 7,700 troops, to the French force under Suchet.

He was interned in France, returning to Spain in 1814. At his own request, and in response to the accusations made against him by the Capitain General of Catalonia, General O'Donnell, he was court-martialled for having surrendered at Lerida. The sentence, absolving him, was given a month after he had died.
