= Jean-Charles-Joseph Rémond =

French painter (1795–1875)

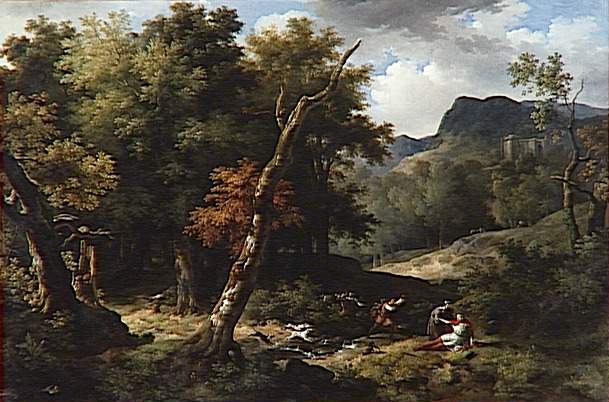
Carloman mortally wounded in the forest of Yvelines by Jean-Charles-Joseph Rémond, Musée du Louvre

Jean-Charles-Joseph Rémond (born in Paris in 1795 and died in Paris in 1875) was a French painter, pupil of Jean-Victor Bertin and Jean-Baptiste Regnault. He won the Prix de Rome award in 1821.

Rémond, who devoted himself to landscape history, ceased to exhibit in 1848.
