= Sachiko =

- Pronunciation: SAH-chee-ko
- Gender: Female

Origin
- Origin: Japanese
- Meaning: Many different meanings depending on the kanji used
- Region of origin: Japan

Other names
- Related names: Sachi; Sachie; Sachika; Sachimi; Sachiyo; Sachio

Sachiko (サチコ, さちこ) is a feminine Japanese given name that means "child of bliss." It also means "happiness" when it is written with the kanji characters 幸子. One common short form of the name is Sachi.

== People ==
- Sachiko, Princess Hisa (久宮祐子内親王; 1927–1928), Japanese princess
- Sachiko Amari, Japanese astrophysicist
- Sachiko Eto (江藤 幸子; 1947–2012), Japanese cult leader and serial killer
- Sachiko Hirayama (平山 佐知子; born 1971), Japanese politician
- Sachiko Honda (本田 幸子; 1930–2020), Japanese 8-dan professional go player
- Sachiko Kiyono (キヨノ サチコ; 1947–2008), Japanese picture book author
- Sachiko Murata (村田 幸子; born 1943), Japanese scholar
- Sachiko Muto (born 1975), Swedish academic and open source advocate
- Sachiko Sono (園 祥子; 1867–1947), the fifth concubine of Emperor Meiji
- Sachiko Takamure (高群 佐知子; born 1971), Japanese shogi player
- Sachiko Tsuruta, Japanese-born American astrophysicist.
- Sachiko Yamada, pseudonym used by kidnap victim Fusako Sano
- Joyce Sachiko Tsunoda (born 1938) American college administrator

=== Arts ===
- Sachiko Chijimatsu (千々松 幸子; born 1937), Japanese actress, voice actress and narrator
- Sachiko Hamano (浜野 佐知子; born 1948), Japanese pink film director
- Sachiko Hayashi (born 1962), Japanese-born, Sweden-based visual artist
- Sachiko Hidari (左 幸子; 1930–2001), Japanese actress and film director
- Sachiko Kamachi (蒲池 幸子; 1967–2007), known as Izumi Sakai, Japanese singer and model
- Sachiko Kamimura (神村 幸子; born 1970), Japanese animator
- Sachiko Kobayashi (小林 幸子; born 1953), Japanese enka singer and voice actress
- Sachiko Kodama (born 1970), Japanese sculpture artist
- Sachiko Kojima (小島 幸子; born 1979), Japanese actress and voice actress
- Sachiko Kokubu (国分 佐智子; born 1976), Japanese actress and fashion model
- Sachiko Matsubara (松原 幸子; born 1973), known as Sachiko M, Japanese experimental musician
- Sachiko Murakami (born 1980), Canadian poet
- Sachiko Murase (村瀬 幸子; 1905–1993), Japanese stage and film actress
- Sachi Parker (born 1956), born Stephanie Sachiko Parker, American actress who has film and television credits
- Sachiko Suzuki (鈴木 早智子; born 1969), Japanese singer, actress and tarento

=== Sports ===
- Sachiko Fujita (藤田 幸子; born 1968), Japanese former volleyball and beach volleyball player
- Sachiko Fukunaka (福中 佐知子; born 1968), Japanese former volleyball player
- Sachiko Ito (伊藤 幸子; born 1975), Japanese softball player
- Sachiko Jumonji (十文字 幸子; born 1989), known as Sendai Sachiko, Japanese professional wrestler
- Sachiko Kamo (加茂 幸子; 1926–2003), Japanese tennis player
- Sachiko Kato (加藤 幸子; born 2000), Japanese rugby union player
- Sachiko Kishimoto (岸本 幸子; born 1936), Japanese long jumper
- Sachiko Kodama (volleyball) (小玉 佐知子; born 1978), Japanese retired female volleyball player
- Sachiko Konishi (小西 祥子; born 1982), Japanese race walker
- Sachiko Masumi (桝見 咲智子; born 1984), Japanese retired track and field athlete
- Sachiko Morimura (森村 幸子; born 1972), Japanese gymnast
- Sachiko Morisawa (森沢 幸子; born 1943), Japanese former international table tennis player
- Sachiko Otani (大谷 佐知子; born 1965), Japanese former volleyball player
- Sachiko Saito (斎藤 幸子; 1947–2000), Japanese speed skater
- Sachiko Sugiyama (杉山 祥子; born 1979), Japanese volleyball player
- Sachiko Yamada (swimmer) (山田 沙知子; born 1982), Japanese Olympic and former World-Record-holding freestyle swimmer
- Sachiko Yamamoto (山本 さち子; born 1970), Japanese alpine skier
- Sachiko Yamashita (山下 佐知子; born 1964), Japanese former long-distance runner
- Sachiko Yamazaki (山崎 幸子; born 1962), Japanese swimmer
- Sachiko Yokota (横田 幸子; born 1952), Japanese table tennis player

== Fictional characters ==
- Juraku Sachiko (聚楽 幸子), is the main antagonist in the gambling spin-off series, Kakegurui Twin. She is the former Public Morals Committee Chairwoman of the Student Council at Hyakkaou Private Academy.
- Sachiko (幸子), the second-eldest Makioka sister in the novel The Makioka Sisters
- Shinozaki Sachiko (篠崎 サチコ), the antagonist in the dōjin soft video game series Corpse Party
- Sachiko, a character in the psychological thriller novel The Asylum for Wayward Victorian Girls
- Sachiko (software), a Vocaloid vocal released for Vocaloid 4.
- Sachiko Kawamura, from the anime NANA.
- Sachiko, title character of a 1982 novel by Shusaku Endo
- Hirokōji Sachiko (広小路 幸子), the art student from the Studio Ghibli movie, From Up on Poppy Hill.
