= Smith & Wesson M&P (disambiguation) =

Smith & Wesson M&P ("Military & Police") is a line of semi-automatic pistols by manufacturer Smith & Wesson.

Smith & Wesson M&P may also refer to:

== Pistols ==
- Smith & Wesson M&P22, a rimfire pistol styled after the full-sized M&P
- M&P Bodyguard 380, a subcompact centerfire pistol

== Rifles ==
- Smith & Wesson M&P15, a centerfire AR-type rifle
- Smith & Wesson M&P15-22, a rimfire rifle styled after the AR-15
- Smith & Wesson M&P10, a centerfire rifle styled after the AR-10

== Revolvers ==
- Smith & Wesson Model 10, an older name of the Smith & Wesson Model 10 mid-size revolver used from 1899 to 1957
- M&P Bodyguard 38, a subcompact centerfire revolver
- Smith & Wesson M&P R8, a SWAT revolver from the Performance Center
