= Bodyguard (disambiguation) =

A bodyguard is an individual who protects another from harm or threats.

Bodyguard may also refer to:

== Arts, entertainment, and media ==
=== Films ===
- The Bodyguard (1944 film), a Tom and Jerry short
- Bodyguard (1948 film), American crime film noir directed by Richard Fleischer
- Yojimbo (The Bodyguard), a 1961 Japanese samurai film directed by Akira Kurosawa
- The Bodyguard (1973 film) or Karate Kiba, a Japanese film starring Sonny Chiba
- The Bodyguard (1979 film), a Soviet Red Western film
- The Bodyguard (1992 film), an American romantic thriller film starring Kevin Costner and Whitney Houston
- The Bodyguard (2004 film), a Thai wire fu action-comedy
  - The Bodyguard 2 (2007 film), a Thai action comedy sequel film
- Body Guard (2010 film), a 2010 Malayalam romantic comedy film
  - Kaavalan (Bodyguard), a 2011 Tamil remake, or its soundtrack or title track
  - Bodyguard (2011 Hindi film), a Hindi remake, or its soundtrack or title track
  - Bodyguard (2011 Kannada film), a Kannada remake
  - Bodyguard (2012 film), a Telugu remake
- Bodyguard (2016 film), a 2016 Iranian thriller film directed by Ebrahim Hatamikia
- The Bodyguard (2016 film), a Hong Kong drama film

=== Music ===
- "Bodyguard" (Bee Gees song), a 1990 song by the Bee Gees
- "Bodyguard" (Beyoncé song), a 2024 song by Beyoncé
- "Bodyguard", a 2009 song by Shinee
- "Bodyguard", a song by Steel Pulse from their 1984 album Earth Crisis
- The Bodyguard (soundtrack), the soundtrack album from the 1992 film

=== Television ===
- Bodyguard (South Korean TV series), a South Korean television series
- Bodyguard (British TV series), a 2018 British series
- Bodyguards (TV series), a 1996–1997 British series
- "The Bodyguard" (Supergirl), an episode of Supergirl

=== Other uses in arts, entertainment, and media ===
- The Bodyguard (musical), a 2012 stage musical adapted from the 1992 film
- "Bodyguard," a story arc of the Philippine comic strip Pugad Baboy

== People ==
- The Bodyguard (wrestler), a Japanese professional wrestler

== Weapons ==
- Smith & Wesson Bodyguard, a family of small revolvers manufactured by Smith & Wesson
- Smith & Wesson Bodyguard 380, a compact semi-automatic pistol manufactured by Smith & Wesson

== See also ==
- Bodyguard Kiba (disambiguation)
