= Kiba =

Kiba may refer to:

== Places ==
- The Kiba district of Kōtō, Tokyo, Japan
- Shin-Kiba (Japanese: 新木場, lit. 'New Kiba'), Koto, Tokyo, Japan

=== Facilities and structures ===
- Kiba Station, Tokyo Metro
- Kiba Park, Koto, Tokyo, Japan; a park
- Shin-Kiba 1st Ring (New Kiba), an arena in Tokyo
- Kiba Hydroelectric Power Station, Uganda

== People ==
- Ali Kiba (born 1986), Tanzanian musician
- Masao Kiba (born 1974), Japanese soccer player

=== Fictional characters ===
- Kiba Inuzuka, a character in the manga and anime series Naruto
- Kiba, a wolf character in the anime series and manga Wolf's Rain

== Television ==
- Kiba (anime), fantasy anime series
- Kamen Rider Kiva, the 2008 Kamen Rider Series, originally known as Kamen Rider Kiba based on pronunciation

== Other uses ==
- Kiba-dachi (kiba stand) of martial arts
- Kiba music, a genre of music among the Pedi people

== See also ==
- Ki (disambiguation)
- Ba (disambiguation)
- Bodyguard Kiba (disambiguation)
