= M&P Bodyguard =

M&P Bodyguard may refer to either of two handguns:

- Smith & Wesson M&P Bodyguard 38, a revolver
- Smith & Wesson M&P Bodyguard 380, a semi-automatic pistol
