= Abigail Lazkoz =

Spanish artist

- Born: 16 August 1972 (age 54); Bilbao, Spain
- Known for: Painting
- Notable work: 130 000 Years of Last Tendencies
- Awards: Ertibil Visual Arts award (2005); Gure Artea 1st prize (2006)
- Website: www.abigaillazkoz.com

Abigail Lazkoz (born 16 August 1972) is a Spanish artist.

== Biography ==
Lazkoz was born on 16 August 1972 in Bilbao, Spain. She began her fine arts education at the University of the Basque Country/Euskal Herriko Unibertsitatea (UPV/EHU) where she graduated with a specialty in painting. She then attended, on an Erasmus scholarship, The Winchester School of Art in the United Kingdom. She returned to the UPV/EHU where she earned her PhD in painting in 1996. Her first solo exhibition was Fan Club Collection 1: Sam Sheppard (1998) at the Arriola Kultur Aretoa (AKA) in Elorrio, Bizkaia. She then participated in the XVI "Muestra de Arte Joven" (emerging young artists' exhibition) organized by Madrid's National Youth Institute (Injuve). In 2003 she published a collection of drawings named "Todo preocupa a la vez". The following year her work was exhibited at the Bilkin Gallery in Bilbao and at the Momenta Art Gallery in New York. In 2005 she is given The Ertibil Visual Arts award from the Foral Bizkaia Council. She then won the first prize at the Gure Artea event in 2006 granted by the Basque Government in conjunction with Juan Perez Arriegoikoa and Txuspo Poyo. Her next installation was placed at Lleida's "La Panera" Art Center, and consisted of a mural named Natural Disasters. That year she opened an exhibition in Barcelona's Fundació Joan Miró (Shuffle), Bilbao's Rekalde Hall (Máquinas extraordinarias), and Lleida's Centre d'Art la Panera, where she displayed 25 artworks and 4 short stories. In 2010, she exhibited at the Werkraum Godula Bucholz in Denklinger (Germany), named Arqueologia de verano con perro y pájaro. This artwork was part of a group exhibition held at Domus Artiu 2002 in Salamanca, the National Museum Republica in Brasília, and at the Fine Arts Circle in Madrid. She also participated in Pamplona's 12th visual arts biennial.

== Featured artworks ==
=== 130 000 Years of Last Tendencies ===
130 000 Years of Last Tendencies is one of Lazkoz's most valued works. Displayed at Bilbao's museum, it consists of a giant mural in acrylic paint which occupies the four walls of the exhibit, only accompanied of 5 drawings with Chinese and pigmented ink. The artwork's theme is related to death, as it depicts images of a cemetery where burials and headstones covered with trees can be seen. The title reflects this themed exhibit, which is a tribute to the fact that 130.000 years ago Homo sapiens became aware of their mortality and began to bury their dead. The artist interprets her work as an exorcism of her personal fears and a tribute to artists like Sánchez-Cotán.

=== Distopía literal ===
This artwork reflects on the concept of happiness, since the Enactment of the Cadiz Constitution until nowadays. It's a visual combination of posters, wooden signs, stickers, banners, and other artistic creations. It includes a collection of popular sayings, newspaper clippings and institutional text, one for each year since the creation of La Pepa, as 1812's Spanish constitution is popularly known. Using 200 written texts from more than 50 countries, this artwork offers a tour through the idea of happiness. Starting with the post French Revolution through Romantic Nihilism, the Antislavery and Post Colonial movements, the women's rights and the Industrial Revolution. The workers' rights and scientific advances in society. It is a chronological mosaic emphasizing this complex concept, happiness.

== Featured exhibitions ==
- 1998 – Fan Club Collection 1: Sam Sheppard, Arriola Kultur Aretoa, Elorrio
- 2004 – Galeria Bilkin, Bilbao
- 2009 – Shuffle, Espai 13, Fundació Joan Miró, Barcelona
- 2010 – New Work Werkraum Godula Buchholz, Denklingen, Germany
