= Artfutura =

Annual digital culture festival

ArtFutura is an annual festival of digital culture. It was first staged in Barcelona on 11 January 1990. Other sites have included Buenos Aires, Ibiza, London, and Montevideo.

ArtFutura is directed by Montxo Algora.

== Editions ==
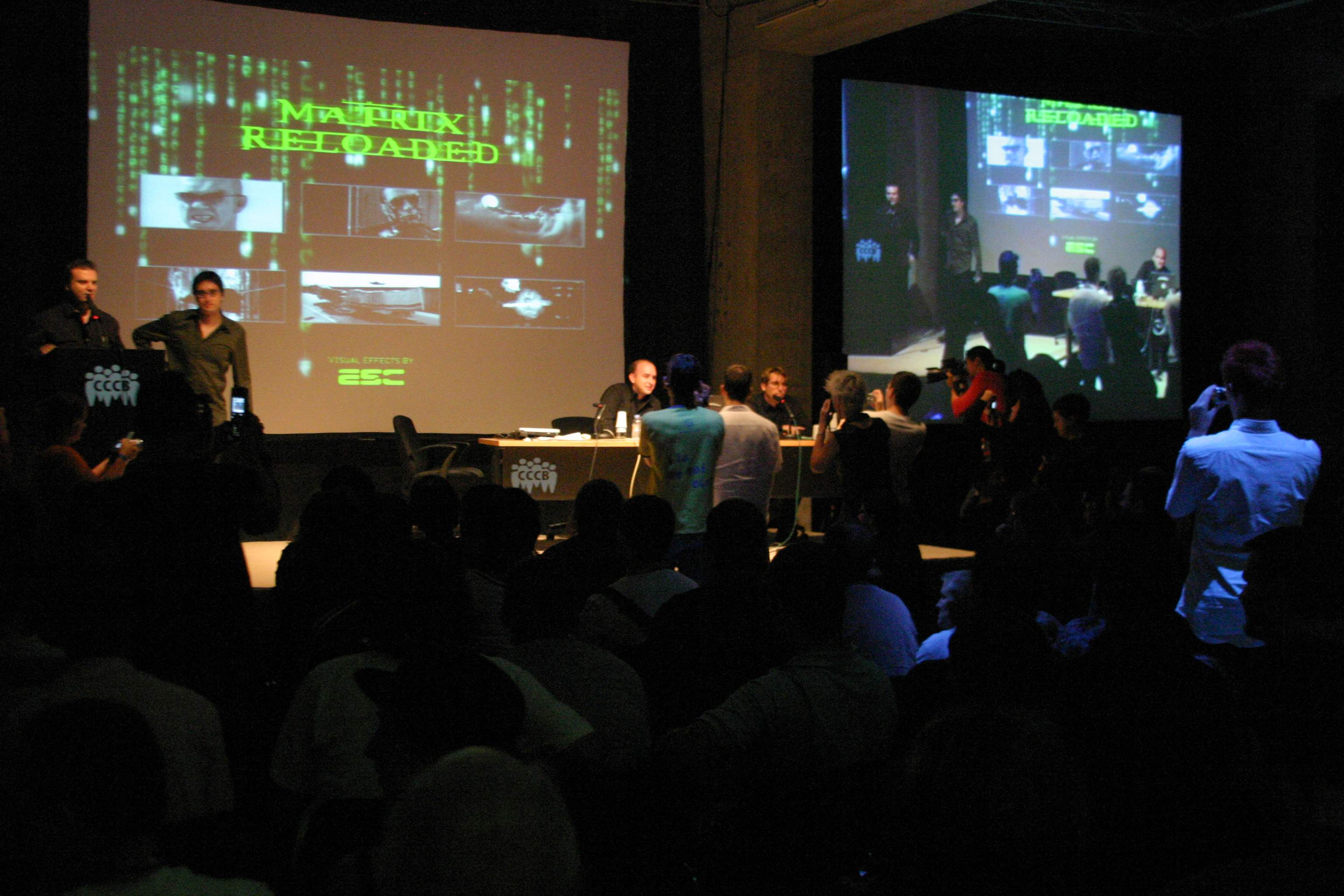
Edición del 2003.

- 1990 Virtual Reality
- 1991 Cybermedia
- 1992 Global Mind
- 1993 Artificial Life
- 1994 Cyberculture
- 1995 Virtual Communities
- 1996 Robots & Knowbots
- 1997 The Future of the Future
- 1998 Second Skin
- 1999 Digital Leisure
- 2000 Internet as Cyborg
- 2001 Collective Art
- 2002 The Web as Canvas
- 2003 The Painted Word
- 2004 Augmented Reality
- 2005 Living Objects, Sensitive Spaces
- 2006 Data Aesthetics
- 2007 The Next Web
- 2008 Souls and Machines
- 2009 From Virtual Reality to Social Networks
- 2010 We Live in Public
- 2011 Reviewing the Future
- 2012 Our Culture is Digital
- 2013 Feeding the Web
- 2014 The Digital Promise
- 2015 Collective Intelligence
- 2016 From Virtual Reality to 3D Internet
- 2017 Digital Creatures
- 2018 / 2019 Humanized Technology
- 2022 / 2023 Processing the Future
- 2024 / 2025 The Future Arrives Early

== Main venue and CircuitoFutura ==
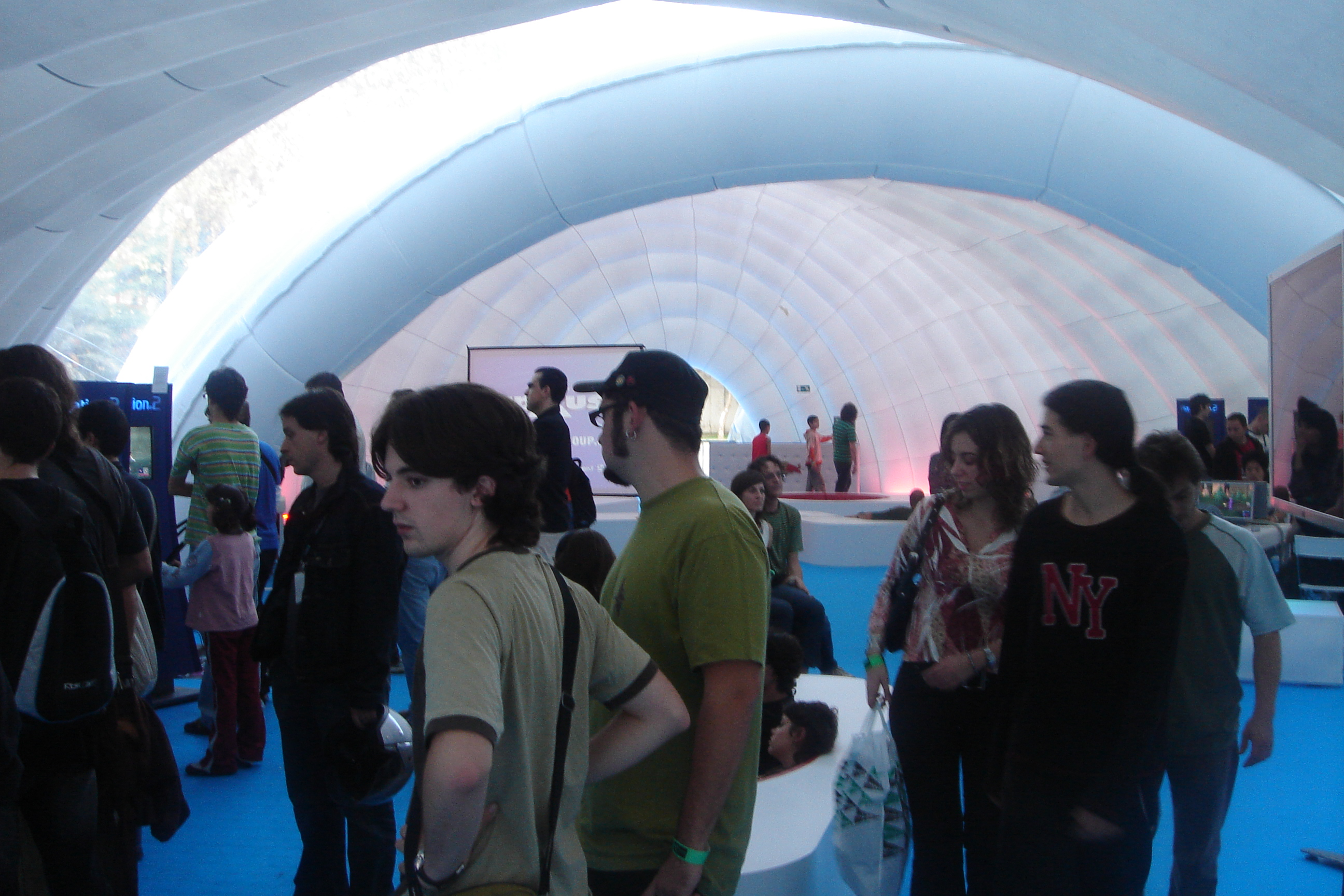

ArtFutura contains conferences, workshops, exhibitions, live shows and an audiovisual program which includes the latest novelties in digital creativity.

Much of the ArtFutura content is developed in Barcelona and Madrid although connections by means of video conferences are established with other cities in which the festival is held.

Among the cities in which ArtFutura is presented are included Buenos Aires, Bogotá, Granada, Lisbon, London, Madrid, México DF, Montevideo, Palma de Mallorca, Paris, Punta del Este, São Paulo, Santiago de Chile, Torino, Tenerife, Vigo and Vitoria-Gasteiz.

== Souls&Machines ==
GaleriaFutura is the division of ArtFutura destined to the exhibitions of digital art.

One of its most important projects was the "Souls&Machines" ( Máquinas&Almas) exhibit that was presented at the Museo Nacional Centro de Arte Reina Sofía, Madrid, Spain and curated by Montxo Algora and José Luis de Vicente.

It included the works of Paul Friedlander, Sachiko Kodama, Theo Jansen, Daniel Rozin, Chico McMurtrie, Rafael Lozano-Hemmer, Daniel Canogar, Evru, David Byrne, David Hanson, Vuk Ćosić, Pierre Huyghe, Harun Farocki, Muntadas, Ben Rubin, Mark Hansen, Antoni Abad and Natalie Jeremijenko.

== Catalog ==
For each edition of the festival, ArtFutura edits a printed catalog which includes a selection of articles on digital art and culture.
