= Paul Friedlander (artist) =

Paul Friedlander (born 1951) is an English light artist who first trained as a physicist. Friedlander obtained a bachelor's degree in Physics and Mathematics at the University of Sussex and was tutored by Sir Anthony Leggett who later was awarded a Nobel Prize for his work on superfluidity. In 1976 he graduated with a B.A. in Fine Art at Exeter College of Art, UK. Friedlander worked as a lighting and stage designer for theatrical productions and avant-garde music before devoting himself to kinetic art at the age of 36. He lives and works in London, United Kingdom (UK).

== Early life ==
Friedlander was born in Manchester, UK, and his family moved to Cambridge when he was three. His father, F. Gerard Friedlander (1917-2001), was the son of Elfriede and Paul Friedländer. He was a lecturer and reader of mathematics at the University of Cambridge and later made a fellow of the Royal Society. Friedlander's mother, Yolande Friedlander, was an abstract artist. His parents were non-conformist and encouraged Paul to follow his own inclinations. As a child Friedlander was inspired by the space age and dreamed of building his own interstellar spaceships.

== Artwork ==
Paul Friedlander became fascinated by art involving the use of movement and light in the late 1960s, when he visited the Cybernetic Serendipity exhibition at the Institute of Contemporary Arts and the Kinetics show at the Hayward Gallery. He was most inspired by the works of the cybernetic artists Nicolas Schöffer (1912) and Wen-Ying Tsai (1928). Since then he has been strongly driven to make kinetic works. In 1983 he made an important discovery of the chaotic properties of spinning string and invented chromastrobic light 'light that changes color faster than the human eye can see'.

These innovations became a major foundation for many of his later works. His first sculptures to use chromastrobic light were exhibited in the same year at London's ICA gallery.

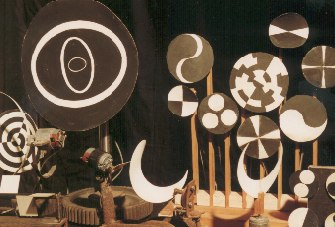
Spin off

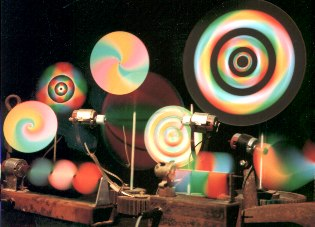
Spin on

First small scale sculptures

Initially Friedlander started experimenting with small sculptures which over the years have increased in size as he technically improved the designs and created more complex systems. The chromastrobic lighting system itself was custom built by Friedlander as there were no other light sources that could produce this light. In recent years he developed ways of modifying standard LED lights, however this has only been possible since around 2000s. His biggest work to date at 15 meters tall was commissioned to be displayed for 'Milan Design Week 2006' in the Porta Ticinese gate.

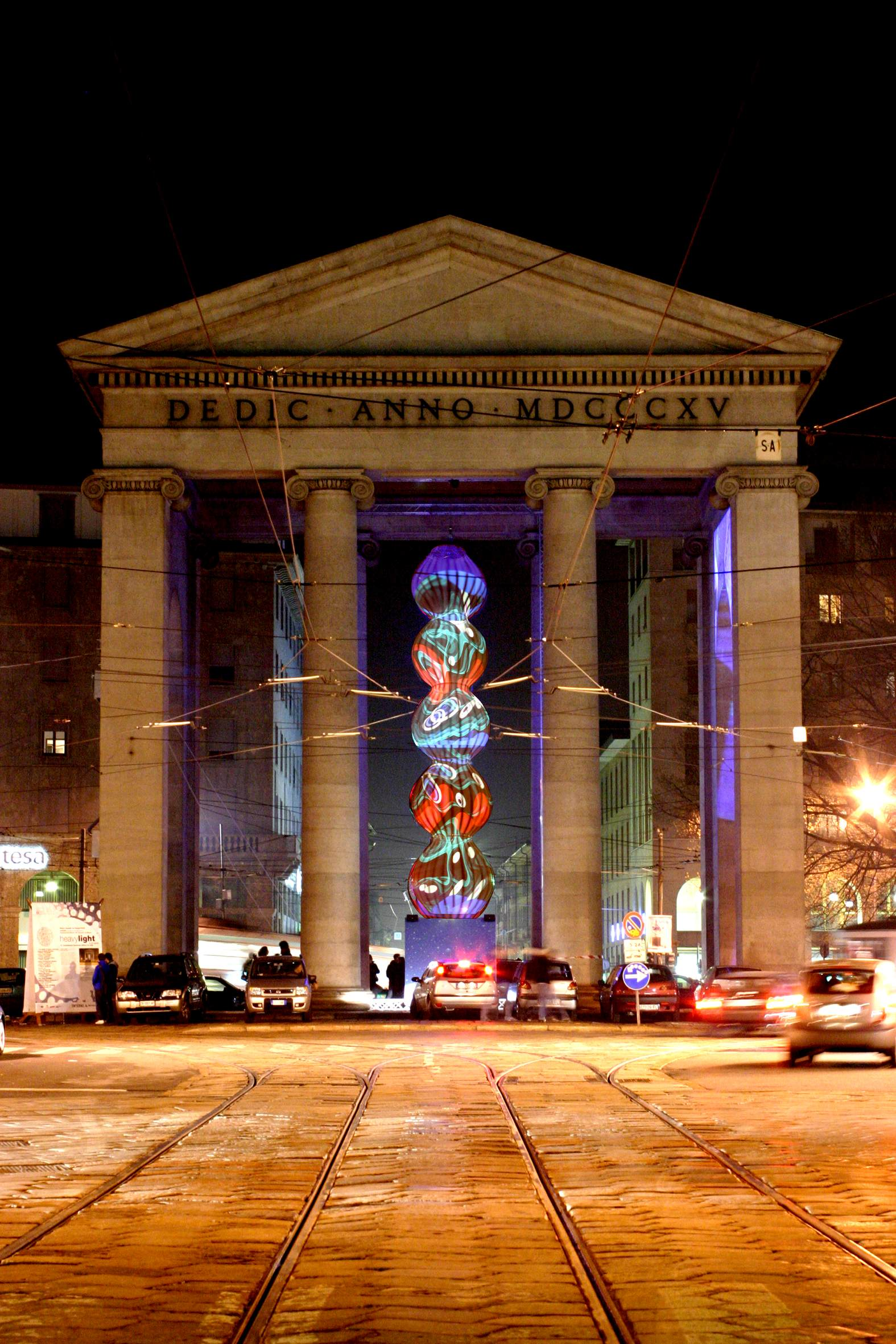
'Gate of Time', 2006 Milan

Many of his works make use of persistence of vision, a property of how light is perceived combined with movement to create a three dimensional kinetic body of light in sculptural form. Friedlander applies his scientific knowledge to his art and is heavily influenced by chaos theory, string theory and cosmology.

In 1991, a mass-produced item was launched based on his light sculptures. Named String Ray, 30,000 were sold in the US.

In 1998 his piece 'Dark Matter' shown in New York at The New York Hall of Science was a winner of an international competition organised by ASCI, Arts Science Collaborators Incorporated for works of interactive art in new media on a monumental scale. Dark Matter also received the 'USHIO America Award for Innovation'.

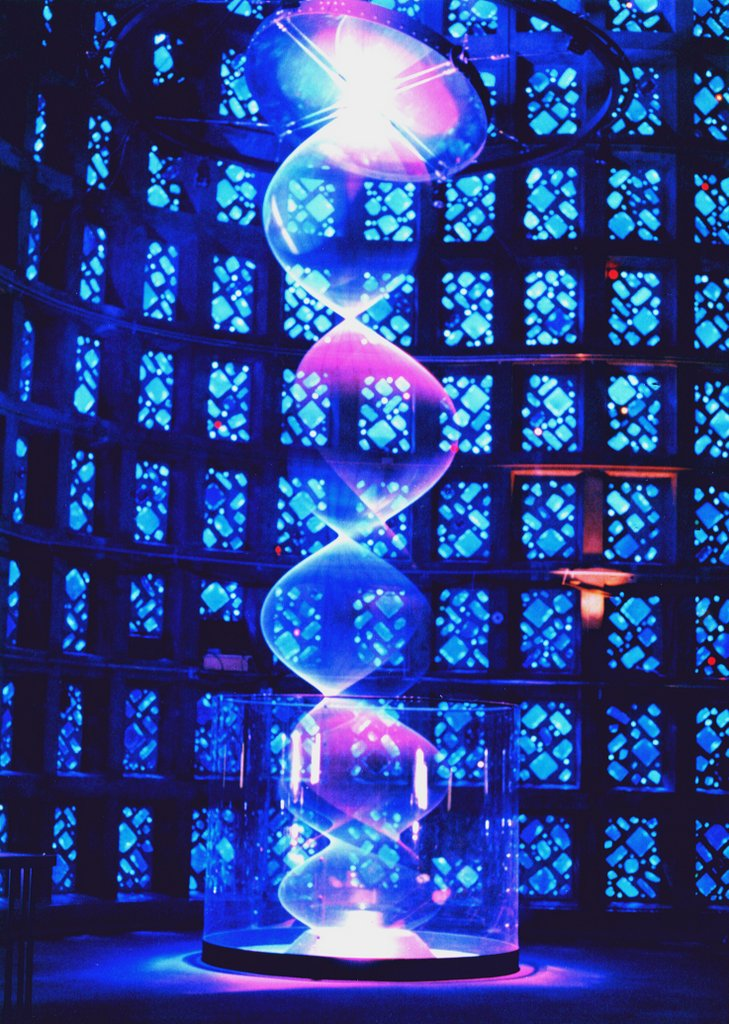
'Dark Matter' 1998, The New York Hall of Science

One of his most notable one man exhibitions 'Timeless Universe' (2006) shown in Valencia at Sala Parpalló gallery, was inspired by the theory of English cosmologist, Julian Barbour that time does not exist. It was composed of 30 pieces varying in shape and size in a darkened tunnel like space illuminated by a combination of chromastrobic lights, stage lights and video. Friedlander's Projections were generated by computers in real time. For the imagery projected on his sculptures he used written records ranging from ancient scripts, signs, codes and modern mathematical formula that were fragmented using his own software, creating imagery that was in constant flux and never repeated to correspond with Barbour's ideas that the universe is timeless.

Group shows include SoulsandMachines (2008), at Reina Sofia Museum of Modern Art, Madrid curated by ArtFutura directors Montxo Algora and Jose Luis de Vicente where he showed among other such notables as Theo Jansen, Sachiko Kodama, David Byrne, David Hanson and Rafael Lozano-Hemmer.

Paul Friedlander continues to show his light sculptures around the world in art and science museums and festivals. His work has been shown in four continents and fifteen countries.

== Awards ==
- 1995 won a prize at the prestigious ARTEC, Japan's leading hi-tech art show.
- 1998 Received the USHIO America Award for Innovation.
- 1998 Winner of LIGHTFORMS in New York
- 2003 Kinetic Art Organisation Prize Winner
- 2004 Kinetic Art Organisation Prize Winner

== Notable exhibitions ==
- 1993 'Art in the City', BT Head Office, London
- 'Images du Futur', Montreal, Canada
- 1995 Art Museum, Walsall, England
- Technorama Museum, Switzerland
- 2001 Exit Festival, Maisons des Arts, Creteil, Paris
- Singapore Science Centre
- 2002 'Resonant Wave Festival', Spannwerk, Berlin
- 'Art Futura', Contemporary Culture Centre, Barcelona
- 2003 'Art Rock', St Brieuc, France
- 'Arenas Movedizas Festival', Gijon, Spain
- 2004 'Chromatoforms', October Gallery, London
- 'CanariaMediaFest', Las Palmas, Gran Canaria
- 'Feria', Gijon, Spain
- 2005 46th International Film Festival, Thessaloniki, Greece
- Waterlow Park, London
- Wolfsburg Science Centre, Germany
- 2006 'Timeless Universe', Sala Parpallo, Valencia, Spain
- 'The Gate of Time', Milan Design Week, Italy
- 2008 'Souls and Machines', Museo Nacional Centro de Arte Reina Sofia, Madrid
- 'Via Festival', Le Manege, Maubeuge, France
- 2009 Jerusalem Festival of Light, Jerusalem Archaeological Park, Israel
- 2010 Kopernicus Centre, Warsaw, Poland
- Anchorage Museum at Rasmuson Center, Anchorage, Alaska
- Museum of Science and Industry, Chicago
- ARC 2010, London
- 2011 'Art Futura XXI', Bilbao, Spain
- 2012 'Light Exhibition', Phaeno Science Centre, Wolfsburg, Germany
- 'Spinning Cosmos' Montevideo, Uruguay
- 2013 'Made in Light' Musee en Herbe, Christies, Paris
- 'Tallinn Light Biennale', Estonia
- 2014 'Lumina Light Festival', Cascais, Portugal
- Kinetica Art Fair, London

== See also ==
- Light Art
- Kinetic Art
