= Sachi (disambiguation) =

Indrani, also known as Sachi, is the Consort of Indra in Hindu mythology.

Sachi may also refer to:

- Sachi (name), given name
- Sachi (band), New Zealand electronic music duo

== See also ==
- Sachy (disambiguation)
