= Centre d'Art la Panera =

Museum in Spain

Coordinates: 41°37′3.90″N 0°37′19.37″E

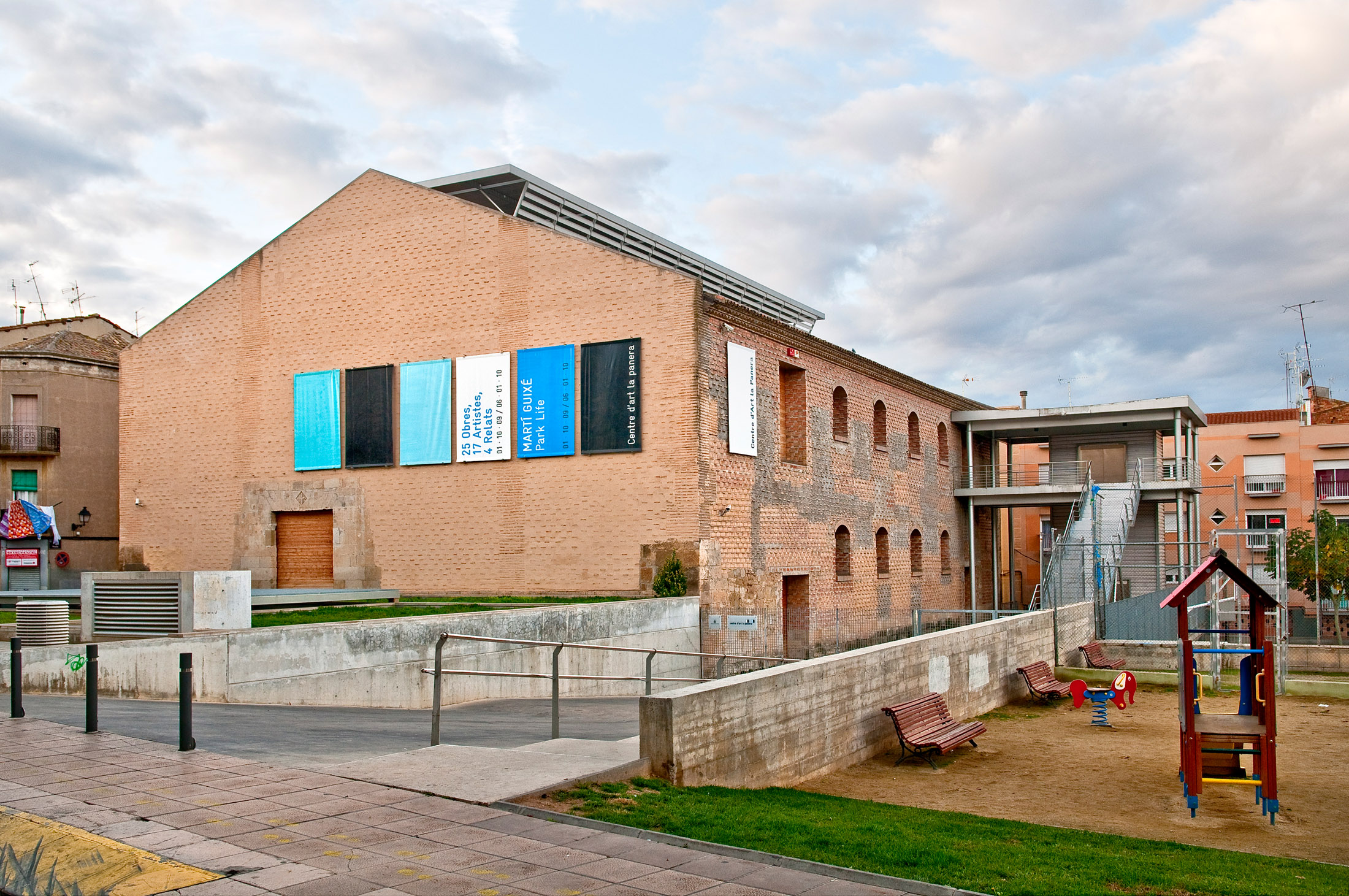
La Panera in 2009

The Centre d'Art la Panera (in English: Art Centre of La Panera) is an art museum in Lleida, Catalonia, Spain. It's named after Carrer de la Panera, the street where it's located, in the old-town area known as Els Vins. Since 2022 the institution is directed by Christian Alonso.

Opened in 1997 with the introduction of the Leandre Cristòfol biennial, it is located in a building (the town's corn exchange) dating from the 12th century, in the medieval area of the town. Its individual exhibitions focus on contemporary art, especially Spanish artists, of which the museum includes a solid permanent collection, as well as educational activities and a documentation centre. Artists whose work has been the subject of exhibitions in La Panera include Alicia Framis, Cabello/Carceller, and Antoni Abad.
