= Girl with Hair Ribbon =

1965 painting by Roy Lichtenstein

- Artist: Roy Lichtenstein
- Year: 1965
- Medium: Oil and Magna on canvas
- Movement: Pop art
- Dimensions: 121.9 cm × 121.9 cm (48 in × 48 in)
- Location: Museum of Contemporary Art Tokyo

Girl with Hair Ribbon is a 1965 pop art painting, by Roy Lichtenstein. It was purchased by the Museum of Contemporary Art Tokyo, for $6 million. This artwork was created using magna and oil paint.

== See also ==
- 1965 in art
