= Sachy =

Sachy may refer to:

- Laurent Sachy (born 1968), French footballer
- Lionel Sachy (born 1944), French footballer
- Nicolas Sachy (born 1967), French footballer
- Sachy, Ardennes, a commune in France
- Sachy (writer) (1972–2020), Indian writer
- Šachy or chess, a game

== See also ==
- Sachi (disambiguation)
