= Sachi (name) =

Sachi is a given name. Notable people with the name include:

- Sachi Amma (安間 佐千; born 1989), Japanese professional rock climber and sport climber
- Sachi Cunningham, American filmmaker, surf photographer and journalist
- Sachi Hamano (浜野 佐知; born 1948), Japanese film director
- Sachi Kagawa (香川 幸), Japanese football player
- Sachi Kokuryu (國立 幸; born 1984), Japanese actress and voice actress
- Sachi Koto (サチ コトー; born 1989), Japanese American journalist
- Sachi Matsumoto (松本 さち; born 1973), Japanese voice actress
- Sachi Mochida (持田 早智; born 1999), Japanese swimmer
- Sachi Ozawa (小澤 幸; born 1976), Japanese short track speed skater
- Sachi Parker (born 1956), American actress
- Sachi Schmidt-Hori, American professor
- Sachi Sri Kantha (born 1953), Sri Lanka-born scientist and historian
- Sachi Tainaka (タイナカ 彩智; born 1986), Japanese singer
- Sachi Tamashiro (born 1980), Mexican telenovela actress
- Indrasakdi Sachi (1902–1975), royal consort of King Vajiravudh (Rama VI) of Siam
- Sachi Komine, character from the Grisaia visual novel series
- Usui Sachi, character from the video game The Future You've Been Dreaming Of

== See also ==
- Podothecus sachi or Japanese poacher, a fish in the family Agonidae
- Sachi-Sethu, a Malayalam screenwriter duo
- Sachi (disambiguation)
- Greta Scacchi (born 1960), Italian Australian actress
