= Smith & Wesson M&P22 =

- Type: Semi-automatic pistol
- Place of origin: United States

Production history
- Designed: 2011
- Manufacturer: Smith & Wesson

Specifications
- Mass: 24 oz (680.4 g)
- Length: 7.6 in (193.0 mm)
- Barrel length: 4.1 in (104.1 mm)
- Cartridge: .22 Long Rifle
- Action: Blowback
- Feed system: 12-round detachable box magazine
- Sights: Iron sights

The Smith & Wesson M&P22 is a semi-automatic pistol chambered in .22 Long Rifle. It is hammer-fired and blowback-operated, and differs from the centerfire M&P variants, which are striker-fired and recoil-operated.

The M&P22 has a single dot on the front sight and notch rear that is adjustable for elevation and windage. In 2013 the scaled-down M&P22 Compact was released. The pistol also has a Picatinny rail.

== Variants ==
- M&P22 Compact
