= Sachie =

- Gender: Female

Origin
- Origin: Japanese
- Meaning: Different meanings depending on the kanji used

Sachie (written: 幸恵 or 沙知絵) is a feminine Japanese given name. Notable people with the name include:

- Sachie Hara (原 沙知絵; born 1978), Japanese model and actress
- Sachie Ishizu (石津 幸恵; born 1992), Japanese tennis player
- Sachie Yuki (結城 幸枝; born 1968), Japanese former competitive figure skater
- Sachie Abe (阿部 幸江; born 1968), Japanese retired professional wrestler
