= Kiba Station =

Metro station in Tokyo, Japan

Coordinates: 35.669391°N 139.806521°E

Kiba Station 木場駅

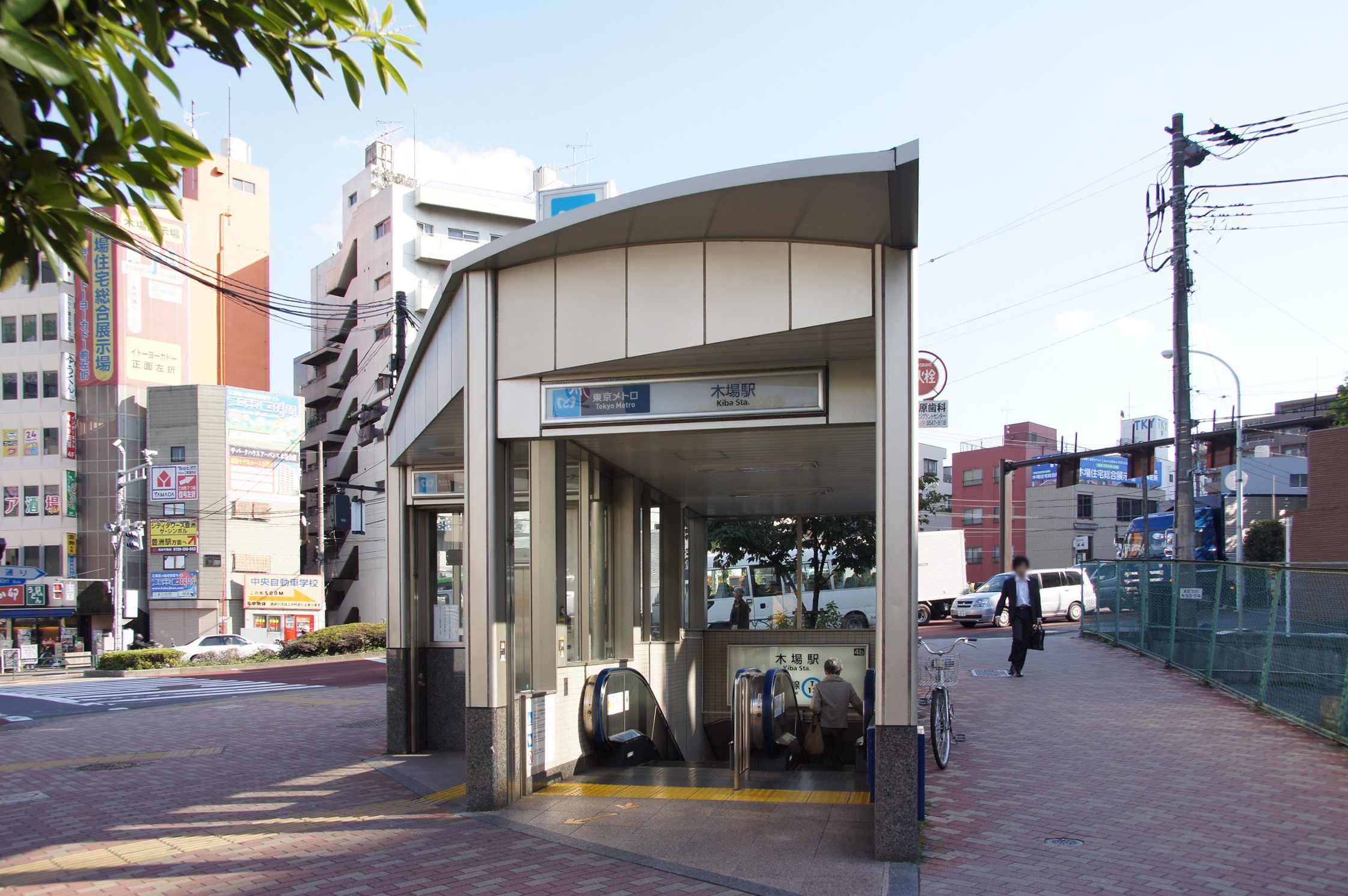
- Exit 4b of Kiba Station, October 2012

General information
- Location: 5-5-1 Kiba, Kōtō-ku, Tokyo; Japan
- Operator: Tokyo Metro
- Line: Tōzai Line
- Platforms: 1 island platform
- Tracks: 2
- Connections: Bus stop

Construction
- Structure type: Underground

Other information
- Station code: T-13

History
- Opened: 14 September 1967; 58 years ago

Passengers
- FY2021: 60,085 daily

Services
Preceding station	Tokyo Metro	Following station
Monzen-nakacho towards Nakano	Tōzai Line Rapid Commuter Rapid Local	Toyocho towards Nishi-Funabashi
Location
- Location within Tokyo wards area Location within Tokyo Keiyo area Location within Kanto Area Location within Japan

Kiba Station (木場駅, Kiba-eki) is a subway station on the Tokyo Metro Tozai Line in Kiba, Kōtō, Tokyo, Japan, operated by Tokyo Metro. It is numbered T-13.

== Lines ==
Kiba Station is served by the Tokyo Metro Tōzai Line from Nakano in the west to Nishi-Funabashi in the east, and is located 14.9 km from Nakano.

== Station layout ==
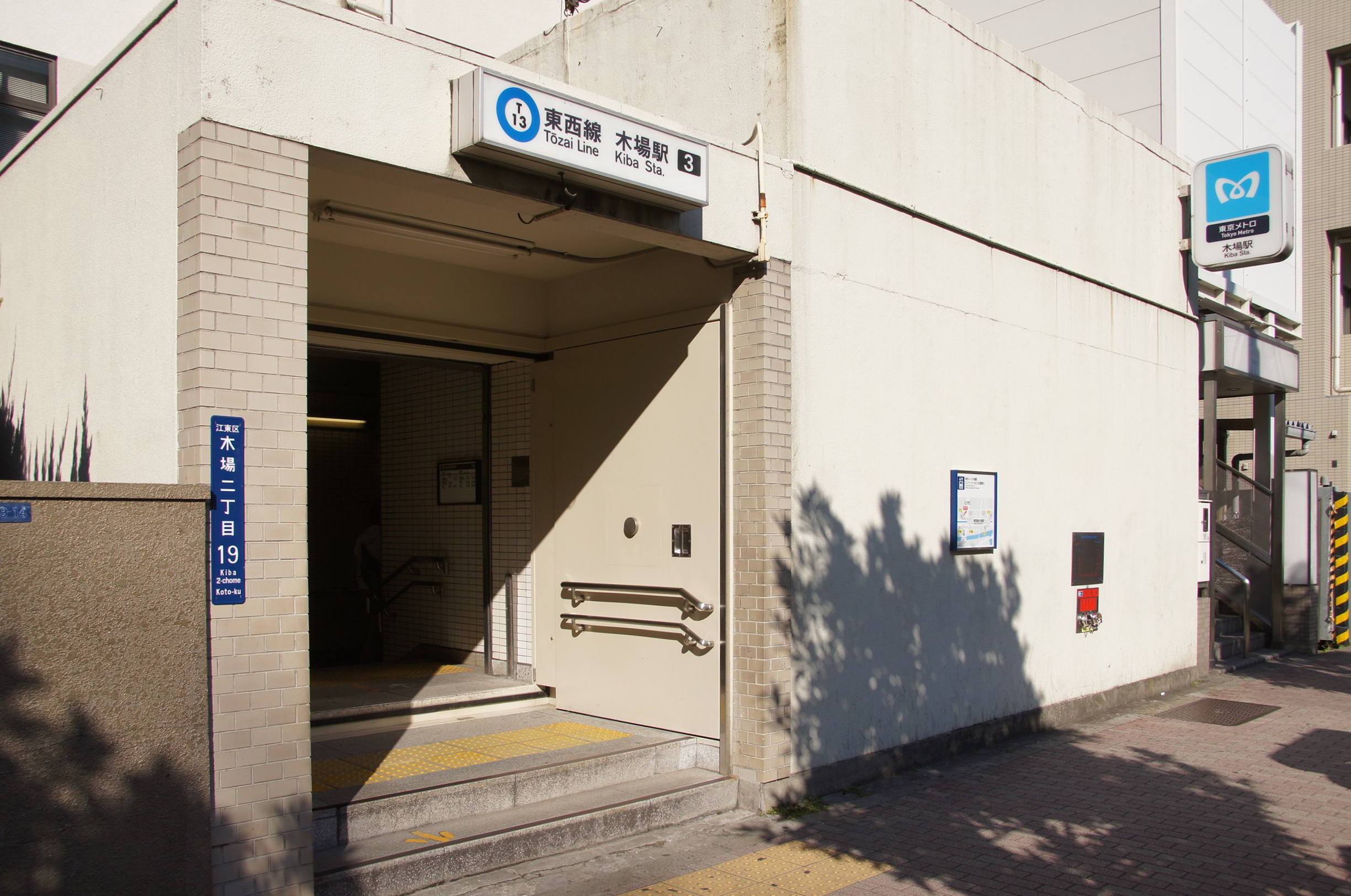
Exit 3, October 2012

The station has a single underground island platform on the 4th basement level, serving two tracks.

=== Platforms ===
1	Tozai Line	for Tōyōchō and Nishi-Funabashi; Chuo-Sobu Line for Tsudanuma; Toyo Rapid Railway Line for Tōyō-Katsutadai
2	Tozai Line	for Otemachi, Kudanshita and Nakano; Chuo-Sobu Line for Mitaka

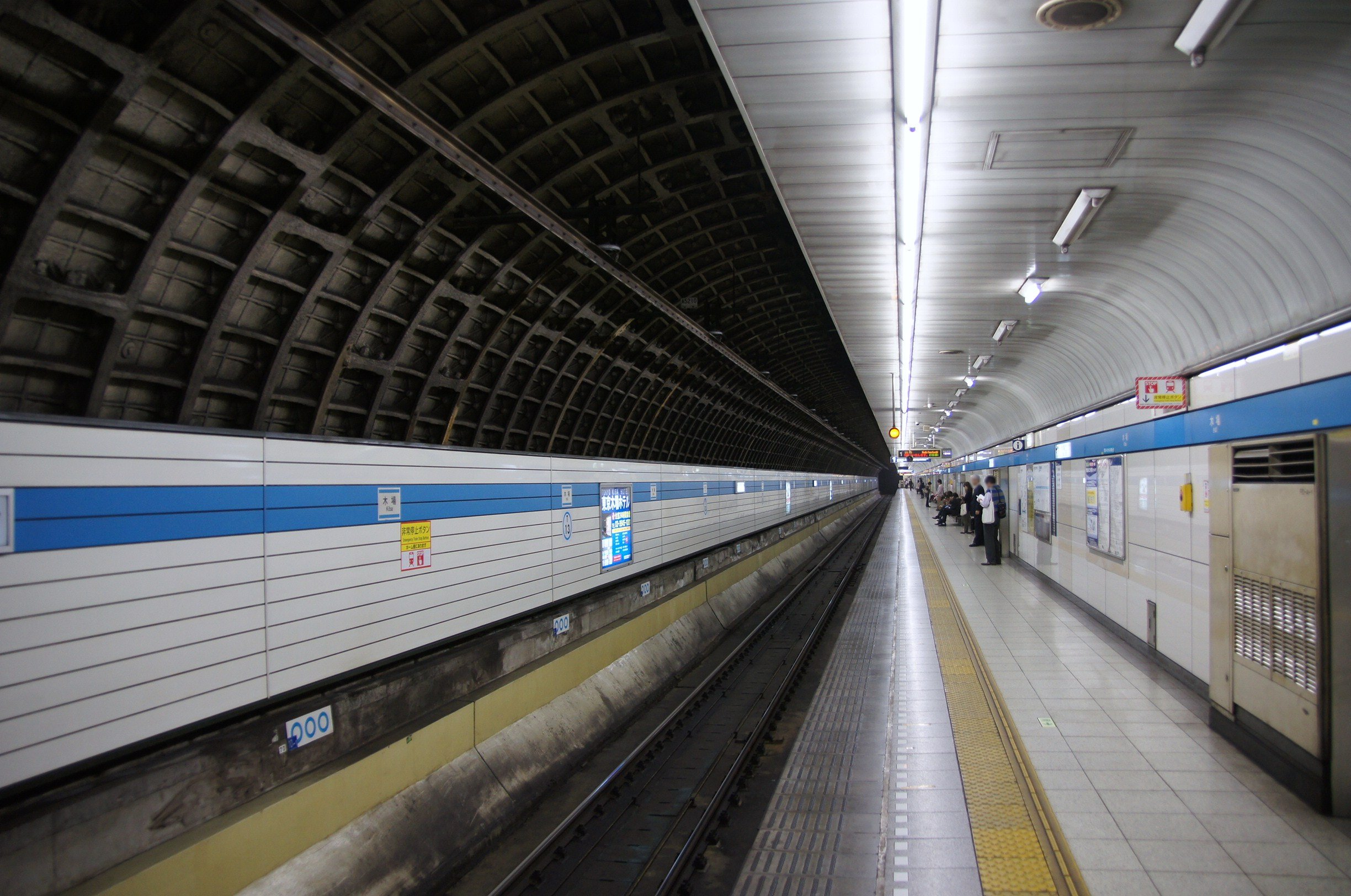
Eastbound platform 1, October 2012

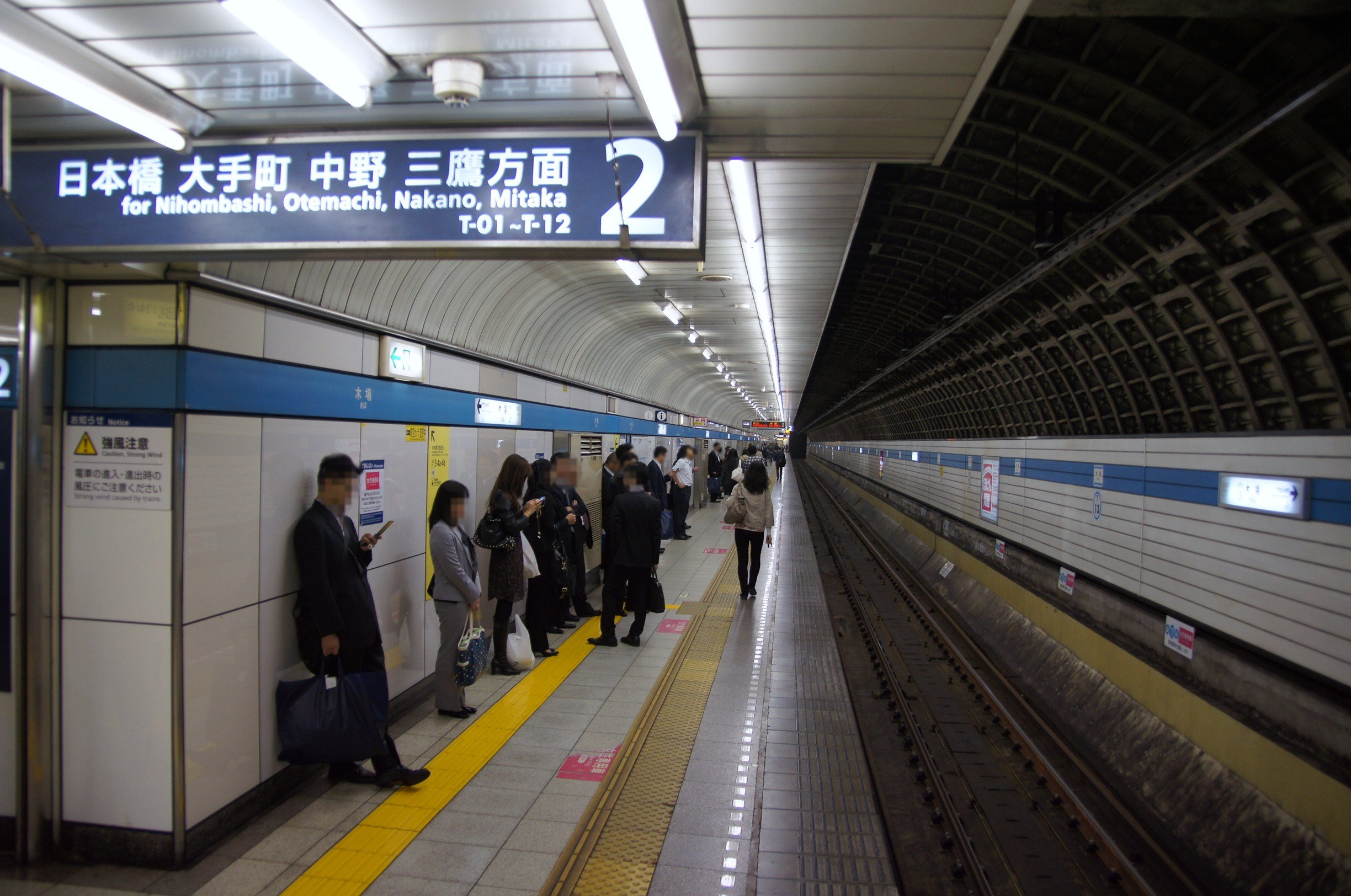
Westbound platform 2, October 2012

== History ==
Kiba Station opened on 14 September 1967. It was the first Tokyo Metro station to be built by shield tunneling.

The station facilities were inherited by Tokyo Metro after the privatization of the Teito Rapid Transit Authority (TRTA) in 2004.

== Passenger statistics ==
In fiscal 2000, the station was used by an average of 54,071 passengers daily.

In the 2015 data available from Japan’s Ministry of Land, Infrastructure, Transport and Tourism, Kiba → Monzen Nakacho was one of the train segments among Tokyo's most crowded train lines during rush hour.

== Surrounding area ==
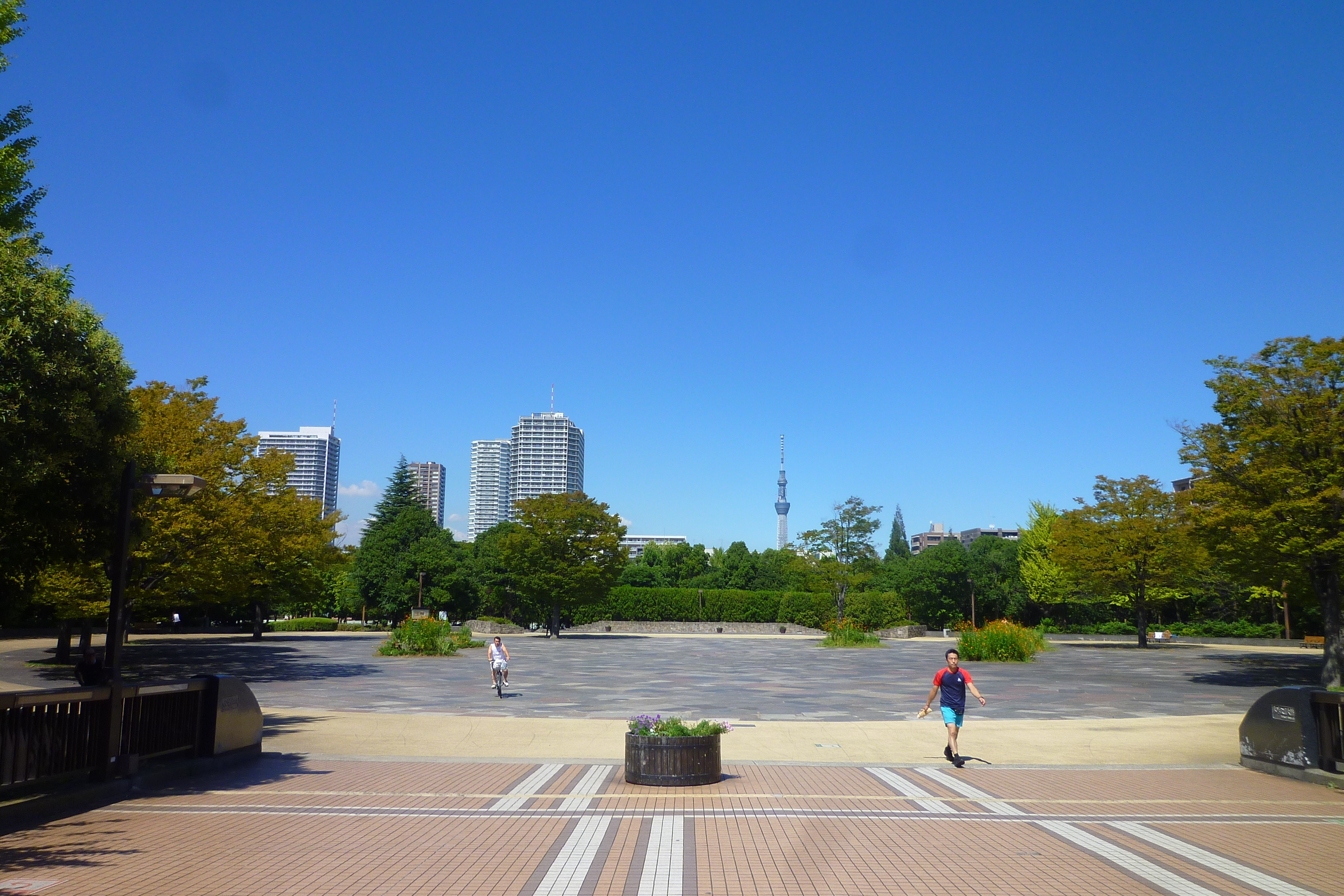
Kiba Park, September 2011

- Museum of Contemporary Art Tokyo
- Kiba Park
- Fukagawa Police Station
- Fukagawa Fire Station
- Heikyu Elementary School
- Toei Ōedo Line Kiba Rolling Stock Maintenance Depot
