= Sachika =

Sachika is a given name. Notable people with the name include:

- Sachika Misawa (born 1993), Japanese voice actress
- Sachika Udara (born 1995), Sri Lankan cricketer
