= Smith & Wesson M&P =

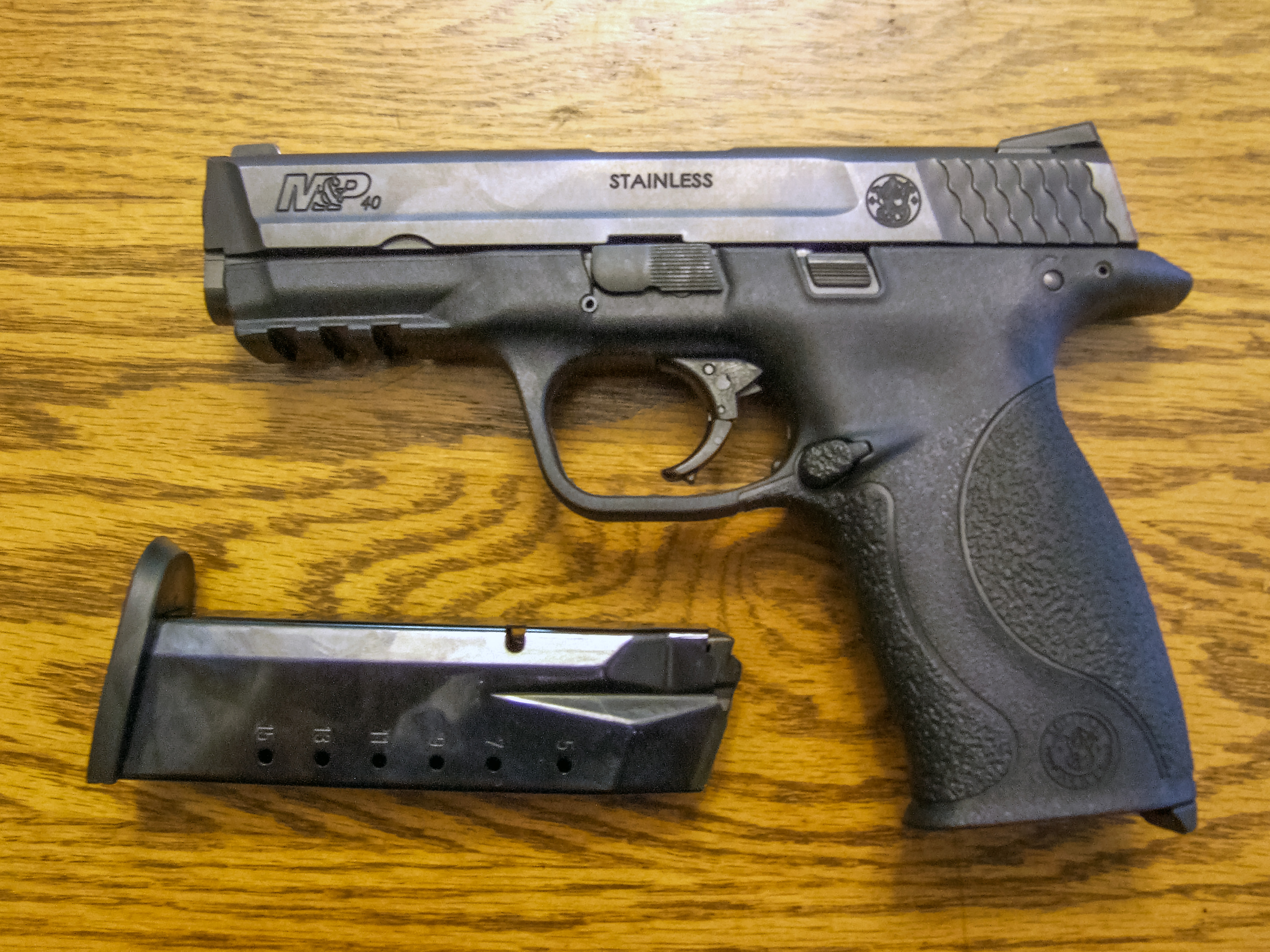
- A Smith & Wesson M&P40 with a detached magazine
- Type: Semi-automatic pistol
- Place of origin: United States

Service history
- In service: 2005–present
- Used by: See Users

Production history
- Manufacturer: Smith & Wesson
- Produced: 2005–present
- Variants: See Variants

Specifications
- Cartridge: FN 5.7×28mm; 9×19mm Parabellum; 10mm Auto; .22 LR; .22 WMR; .30 Super Carry; .357 SIG; .380 ACP; .40 S&W; .45 ACP
- Action: Short recoil, locked breech
- Feed system: Detachable box magazine
- Sights: Iron sights

The Smith & Wesson M&P (Military and Police) is a polymer-framed, short recoil operated, locked breech semi-automatic pistol introduced in the summer of 2005 by the American company Smith & Wesson. Most variants use a Browning-type locking system, while the 5.7×28mm variant uses a rotating barrel with a muzzle booster. While targeted at law enforcement agencies, the M&P is also widely available on the commercial market.

== History ==
The M&P is a hybrid evolution of the Smith & Wesson Sigma and Smith & Wesson SW99 design but does not share parts compatibility with the Sigma. The M&P design has an improved trigger and enhanced ergonomics that allow for end-user customization. An industry standard Picatinny rail and a higher grip has been afforded with an improved grip and beavertail. Many of the ergonomic study elements that had been incorporated into the Sigma and the Smith & Wesson SW99 were brought over to the M&P. The improved trigger weight and feel and the unique takedown method (not requiring a dry-fire pull of the trigger) were meant to set the M&P apart from the popular Glock pistols. The M&P is standard issue for many police services and some armored truck companies.

== Design details ==
The M&P is a striker-fired semi-automatic pistol. The trigger system prevents the firearm from discharging unless the trigger is fully depressed, even if the pistol is dropped. An internal lock and/or magazine disconnect are available as options and an optional external thumb safety became available in 2009.

The pistol frame is made out of Zytel polymer reinforced with a stainless steel chassis. The pistol comes with four removable and interchangeable grip inserts and features a 18° grip angle. The slide and barrel are made of stainless steel, that after hardening is treated with a proprietary nitriding process called Melonite. The Melonite process produces a matte gray non-glare surface with a 68 Rockwell C surface hardness rating. The pistol has a low slide profile which holds the barrel axis close to the shooter's hand and makes the M&P more comfortable to shoot by reducing muzzle rise and allowing faster aim recovery in rapid shooting sequence. The slide has four contact points with the frame. This was done to make the rail system self cleaning, by leaving room for any dirt or small foreign objects to fall out of the weapon.

As the slide of the pistol enters battery, the striker engages the sear. At this point, the striker is held back in a partially cocked condition. When the trigger of the M&P is pulled, the trigger bar first engages the firing pin safety plunger, lifting it upward, and releasing the firing pin safety. At the rearward extreme of the trigger bar's travel, it engages the sear. The sear is rotated downward by the trigger bar, fully cocking, then releasing the striker. The striker makes contact with the primer of the chambered round, which in turn ignites the gunpowder and propels the bullet forward. According to M&P gunsmith Dan Burwell, the angle on the rear face of the sear creates a camming action against the striker. This camming action moves the striker to the rear very slightly during the trigger pull, thus finishing the "cocking". This system is similar to the partially tensioned striker found in the Glock series of pistols. When the pistol cycles for the next shot, the striker will be automatically pre-set in a 98% cocked position. Because the striker is only 98% cocked prior to the trigger being pulled, Smith & Wesson classifies the M&P's action as "striker fired (double action only)".

The M&P factory trigger is of the jointed type and has a trigger travel of 7.6 mm (0.3 in) and is rated at 29 N (6.5 lb_{f}). The M&P45c models have a slightly higher rated trigger pull of 31 N (7.0 lb_{f}). The competition oriented M&P40 Pro Series have a reduced trigger pull of 20 N (4.5 lb_{f}) due to the installation of a Smith & Wesson performance center sear. Massachusetts approved models have a trigger pull of 45 N (10 lb_{f}). The pistols are delivered with two magazines.

The standard iron sights are of the three dot type and made of steel. Both the front and rear sights are dove-tailed into the slide, and can be horizontally drifted to adjust for windage correction. An integrated Picatinny rail can be found underneath the slide on the front of the frame for attaching tactical lights, lasers and other accessories.

There are ten-round magazine versions of each pistol available for the California, Massachusetts, New York, Washington State, New Jersey, Australian, and Canadian markets. Novak tritium night sights are an available option for both the full-sized and compact versions. Another optional accessory is the stainless steel lanyard pin. The new pin replaces the original solid plastic pin with one that has a stainless steel ring embedded for use with a lanyard.

== Variants ==
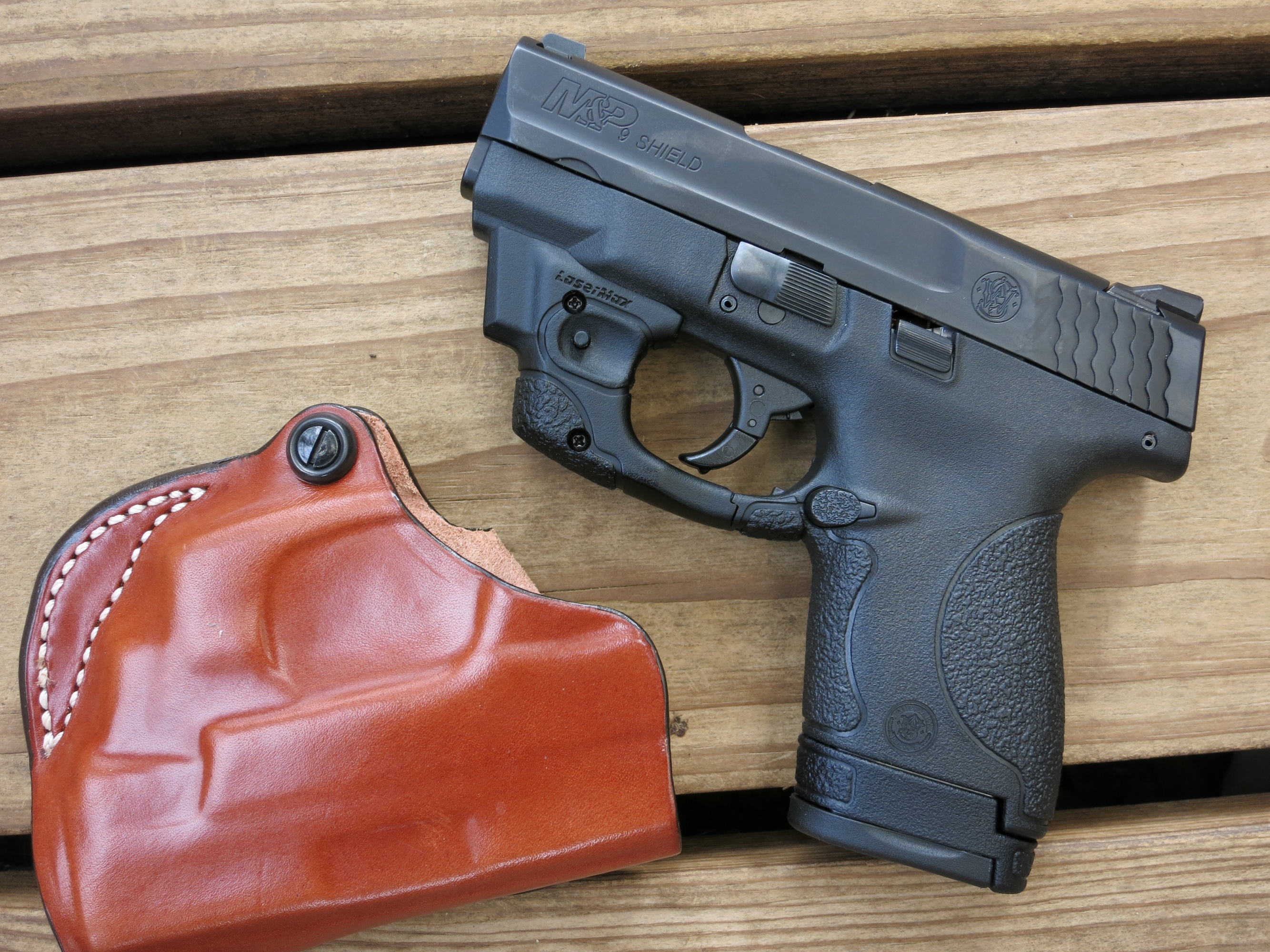
Smith & Wesson M&P9 Shield with LaserMax centerfire lasers

The M&P is available in 9×19mm Parabellum, .30 Super Carry, .380 ACP, .40 S&W, and .45 ACP, with barrel lengths of 79, 89, 102, 104, 108, 114, or 127 mm (3.1, 3.5, 4.0, 4.1, 4.3, 4.5, or 5.0 in). The .357 SIG chambering has been discontinued.

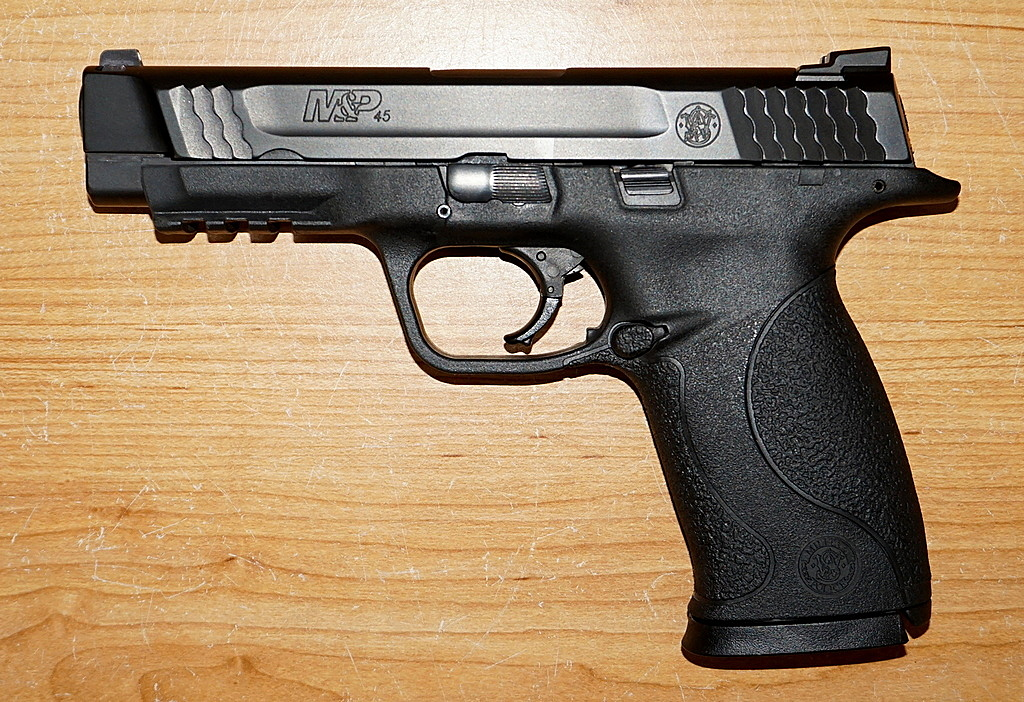
Smith & Wesson M&P45 Full Size

The M&P9 JG was a standard size Champion series variant named for Julie Golob and fitted with a Warren Tactical rear sight and a fiber optic front sight. Besides the three standard black grip inserts it came with two small and medium-sized pink grip inserts. A portion of the proceeds from sale of these models was directed to a breast cancer awareness charity and an awareness ribbon was etched on the slide of the pistol.

In 2007 the full-size .45 ACP version of the M&P was introduced sporting a 114 mm (4.5 in) barrel. This model also won Handgun of the Year in 2007.

In 2008, Smith & Wesson introduced new versions of the M&P: the M&P45 Mid-size, the M&P45 Compact, the M&P9L, and the M&P Pro Series. The M&P45 Mid-size sports a 102 mm (4.0 in) barrel and a full-sized grip, and the M&P45 Compact targets the concealed carry market with its 4" barrel and shorter grip (with eight or ten-round capacity).

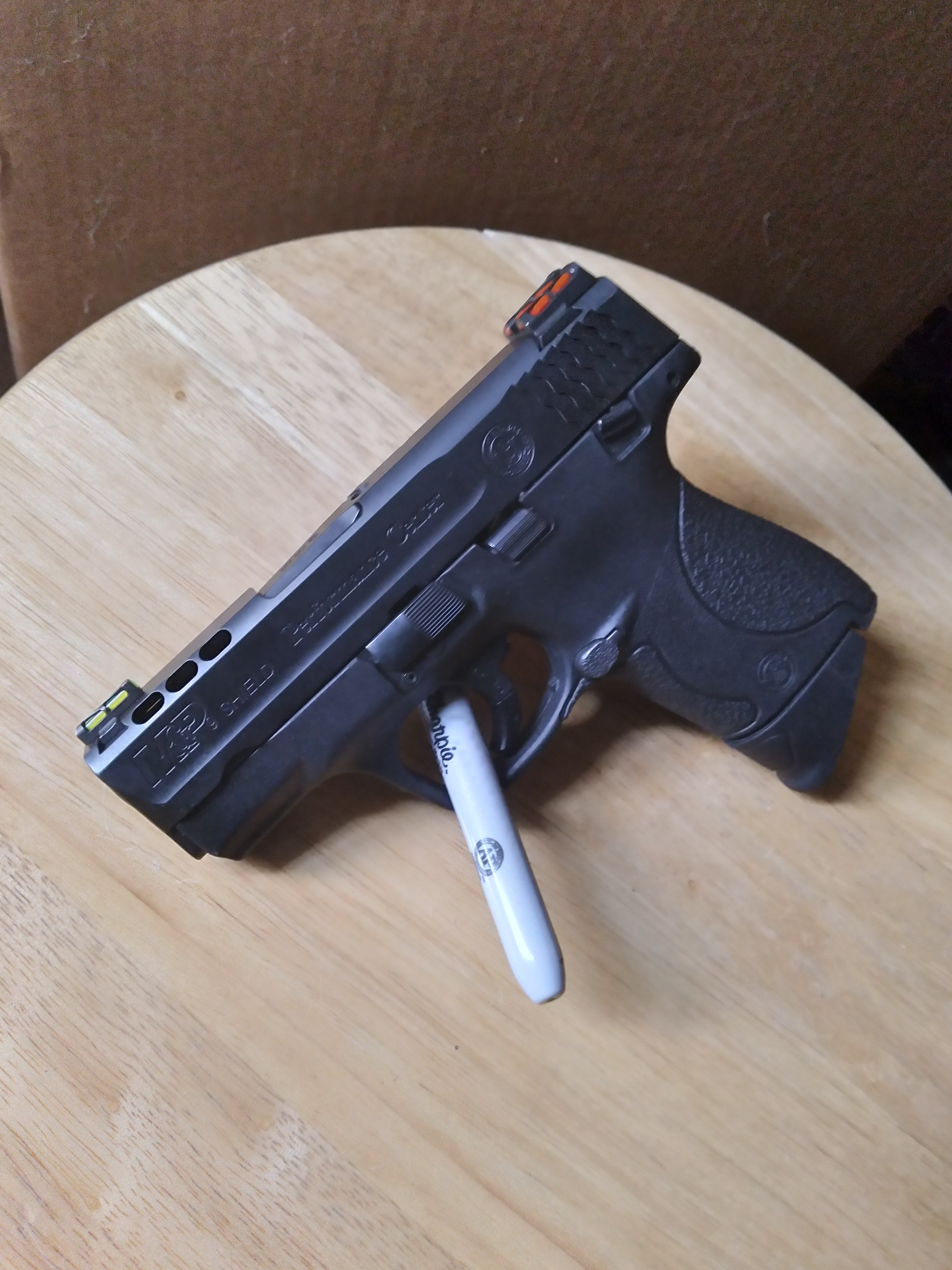
A S&W M&P9 Shield. This is the Performance Center version. This version has a ported barrel.

In 2011, Smith & Wesson released the M&P22, a cosmetically similar handgun chambered in .22 Long Rifle. The internal construction and blowback operation of this rimfire cartridge variant is the same as the Walther P22, which Smith & Wesson used to import into the United States, and completely differs from the centerfire M&P variants. Rather than the three-dot sights found on other models, the M&P22 has a single dot on the front sight and notch rear that is adjustable for elevation and windage. In 2013 the scaled-down M&P22 Compact was released.

In 2017, Smith & Wesson introduced the M&P M2.0 series. Changes include a full-length steel chassis, a rough textured grip, and the improved trigger system of the Pro series.

In November 2021, Smith & Wesson introduced the M&P M2.0 chambered in 10mm Auto to the M&P M2.0 family. Smith & Wesson offers a 4.0 in (101.6 mm) barrel compact model and a larger 4.6 in (116.8 mm) barrel model. Both models with have a 15-round magazine capacity and are built on the M&P45 M2.0 frame. The M&P M2.0 10mm Auto features a new M2.0 flat face trigger and comes with an optics ready slide from the factory. An unloaded 15-round 10 mm Auto magazine weighs 88 g (3.1 oz).

In January 2023, it was announced that a 5.7x28mm variant, the M&P 5.7, will be released with a new gas-operated, locked-breech, rotating threaded Tempo Barrel System and a 22-round magazine. In July 2023, it was announced that a .22 WMR variant, the M&P 22 Magnum, will be released with a new gas-operated, locked-breech, rotating threaded Tempo Barrel System and a 30-round magazine. In July 2025, Smith & Wesson announced the introduction of the M&P22X. It comes with 20-round magazines & was designed to be a competitor to the SIG Sauer P322.

Shield

In 2012, Smith & Wesson introduced the M&P Shield in 9mm and .40 S&W. The Shield is a subcompact single-stack magazine variant of the M&P line. The Shield has roughly the same silhouette as the M&P Compact but is considerably thinner at less than 1-inch in width. The Shield is the first M&P to incorporate an improved trigger with positive reset. In 2016, a .45 ACP variant Shield was added to Smith and Wesson's product line. The .45 ACP Shield variant has a 5.1 mm (0.2 in) longer barrel, measuring in at top length of 84 mm (3.3 in), and exhibits larger overall dimensions. In April 2021, the original 1.0 Shield platform was discontinued after the release of M&P Shield Plus.

In 2018, Smith & Wesson introduced the M&P 380 Shield EZ. As the name suggests, the Shield EZ has a number of convenience features including an easy-to-rack slide and an easy-to-load magazine. In late 2019, Smith & Wesson added a 9mm offering to the Shield EZ line. Both the .380 and 9mm variants feature an internal hammer.

In spring 2021, Smith & Wesson introduced the M&P Shield Plus in 9mm. An evolution of the M&P Shield, the M&P Shield Plus, among other improvements, utilizes a double-stack magazine to increase capacity at the sacrifice of a slight increase in width.

The M&P Shield X was introduced in July 2025 and features enhanced ergonomics, a longer 3.6" barrel, an accessory rail, and increased 13+1 magazine capacity.

Bodyguard

In 2014, Smith & Wesson introduced the M&P Bodyguard 380 in .380 ACP. The M&P Bodyguard is functionally identical to the previous released Bodyguard 380, which it replaces. The M&P-branded Bodyguard removes the integrated laser sight of the previous pistol and brings the aesthetics in line with the rest of the M&P product line. Unlike the rest of the M&P pistols, the M&P Bodyguard is not striker-fired. It is a more traditional double-action-only hammer-fired pistol intended for personal protection, concealed carry or as a law enforcement "back-up" gun.

| Model | Barrel length | Cartridge | Capacity (Note: rounds per magazine) | Dimensions (Note: width x height x length) | | Weight (Note: without magazine) | Frame color |
| Model | Barrel length | Cartridge | Capacity | mm | inches | Weight | Frame color |
|---|---|---|---|---|---|---|---|
| M&P22 | 104 mm (4.1 in) | .22 LR | 10 or 12 | 41 × 140 × 191 (Note: with thumb safety, 30 mm (1.2 in) wide without) | 1.6 × 5.5 × 7.5 | 680 g (24.0 oz) | Black |
| M&P22 Compact | 91 mm (3.6 in) | .22 LR | 10 | 38 × 127 × 170 (Note: with thumb safety) | 1.5 × 5.0 × 6.7 | 430 g (15.3 oz) | Black |
| M&P 22 Magnum | 110 mm (4.35 in) | .22 WMR | 30 | 29 × 150 × 213 | 1.13 x 5.9 x 8.4 | 620 g (22 oz) | Black |
| Compact | 89 mm (3.5 in) | 9mm | 10 or 15 | 30 × 109 × 170 | 1.2 × 4.3 × 6.7 | 620 g (21.7 oz) | Black or Dark Earth |
| Compact | 89 mm (3.5 in) | .40 S&W | 10 | 30 × 109 × 170 | 1.2 × 4.3 × 6.7 | 620 g (21.9 oz) | Black or Dark Earth |
| Compact | 89 mm (3.5 in) | .357 SIG | 10 | 30 × 109 × 170 | 1.2 × 4.3 × 6.7 | 630 g (22.2 oz) | Black or Dark Earth |
| Full Size | 108 mm (4.25 in) | 9mm | 10 or 17 | 30 × 140 × 191 | 1.2 × 5.5 × 7.5 | 680 g (24.0 oz) | Black or Dark Earth |
| Full Size | 108 mm (4.25 in) | .40 S&W | 10 or 15 | 30 × 140 × 191 | 1.2 × 5.5 × 7.5 | 687 g (24.25 oz) | Black or Dark Earth |
| Full Size | 108 mm (4.25 in) | .357 SIG | 10 or 15 | 30 × 140 × 191 | 1.2 × 5.5 × 7.5 | 720 g (25.5 oz) | Black |
| M&P9L | 127 mm (5.0 in) | 9mm | 10 or 17 | 30 × 140 × 210 | 1.2 × 5.5 × 8.25 | 710 g (25.2 oz) | Black |
| M&P9 Pro Series | 108 mm (4.25 in) | 9mm | 10, 15, or 17 | 30 × 140 × 191 | 1.2 × 5.5 × 7.5 | 680 g (24.0 oz) | Black |
| M&P9 Pro Series 5" | 127 mm (5.0 in) | 9mm | 10, 15, or 17 | 30 × 140 × 210 | 1.2 × 5.5 × 8.25 | 680 g (24.0 oz) | Black |
| M&P40 Pro Series | 108 mm (4.25 in) | .40 S&W | 15 | 30 × 140 × 191 | 1.2 × 5.5 × 7.5 | 680 g (24.0 oz) | Black |
| M&P40 Pro Series 5" | 127 mm (5.0 in) | .40 S&W | 15 | 30 × 140 × 216 | 1.2 × 5.5 × 8.5 | 740 g (26.0 oz) | Black |
| M&P45c – Compact Size | 102 mm (4.0 in) | .45 ACP | 8 | 30.5 × 121.9 × 181.0 | 1.2 × 4.8 × 7.125 | 740 g (26.2 oz) | Black or Dark Earth |
| M&P45 – Mid-Size | 102 mm (4.0 in) | .45 ACP | 10 | 30 × 140 × 191 | 1.2 × 5.5 × 7.5 | 790 g (27.7 oz) | Black or Dark Earth |
| M&P45 – Full Size | 114 mm (4.5 in) | .45 ACP | 10 | 30 × 140 × 197 | 1.2 × 5.5 × 7.75 | 840 g (29.6 oz) | Black or Dark Earth |
| M&P 10mm M2.0 – Mid-Size | 102 mm (4.0 in) | 10mm Auto | 15 | 33 × 142 × 183 | 1.3 × 5.6 × 7.2 | 790 g (27.8 oz) | Black |
| M&P 10mm M2.0 – Full Size | 117 mm (4.6 in) | 10mm Auto | 15 | 33 × 142 × 201 | 1.3 × 5.6 × 7.9 | 830 g (29.3 oz) | Black |
| M&P Shield | 79 mm (3.1 in) | 9mm | 7 or 8 | 24 × 117 × 155 | 0.95 × 4.6 × 6.1 | 540 g (19.0 oz) | Black |
| M&P Shield | 79 mm (3.1 in) | .40 S&W | 6 or 7 | 24 × 117 × 155 | 0.95 × 4.6 × 6.1 | 540 g (19.0 oz) | Black |
| M&P Shield | 84 mm (3.3 in) | .45 ACP | 6 or 7 | 165 (length) | 6.5 (length) | 580 g (20.5 oz) | Black |
| M&P Shield EZ | 93 mm (3.675 in) | .30 Super Carry | 10 | 173 (length) | 6.8 (length) | 610 g (21.6 oz) | Black |
| M&P Shield EZ | 93 mm (3.675 in) | .380 ACP | 8 | 170 (length) | 6.7 (length) | 520 g (18.5 oz) | Black |
| M&P Shield EZ | 93 mm (3.675 in) | 9mm | 8 | 172 (length) | 6.8 (length) | 660 g (23.2 oz) | Black |
| M&P 5.7 | 127 mm (5 in) | 5.7×28mm | 22 | 215.9 (length) | 8.5 (length) | 760 g (26.7 oz) | Black |
| M&P Bodyguard 380 | 70 mm (2.75 in) | .380 ACP | 6 | 19 × 104 × 133 | .75 × 4.1 × 5.25 | 340 g (12.0 oz) | Black |
| M&P Shield Plus | 79 mm (3.1 in) | .30 Super Carry | 13 or 16 | 28 × 117 × 155 | 1.1 × 4.6 × 6.1 | 550 g (19.3 oz) | Black |
| M&P Shield Plus | 79 mm (3.1 in) | 9mm | 10 or 13 | 28 × 117 × 155 | 1.1 × 4.6 × 6.1 | 570 g (20.2 oz) | Black |

== Users ==
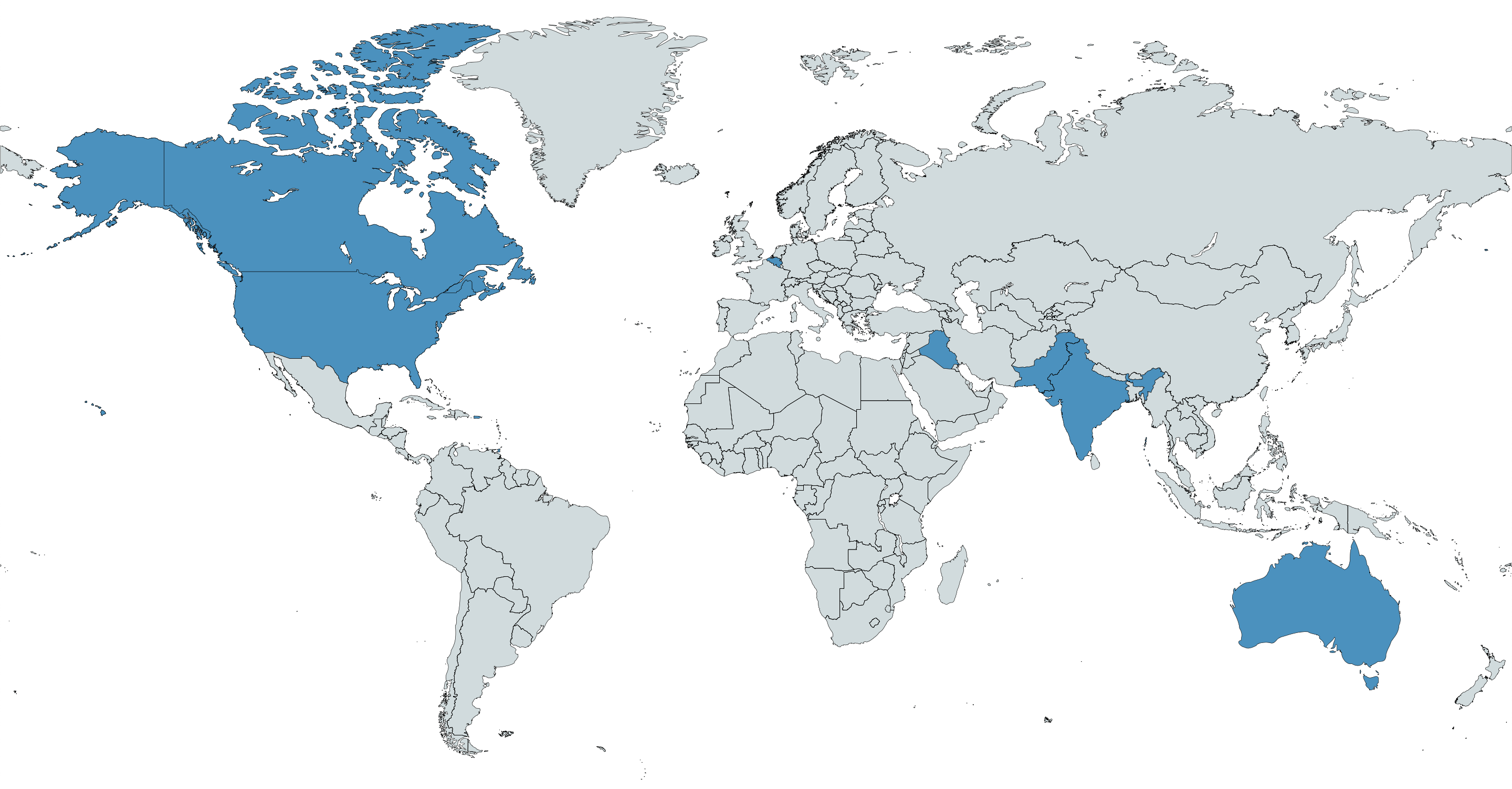
Map with M&P users in blue

=== Current ===
- Australia – M&P40
  - South Australia Police
  - Victoria Police
- Belgium: M&P9 with Federal Police, acquired in 2011 and issued with Blackhawk T-Series holsters from 2023.
- Canada
  - Gatineau Police Department
  - St. Thomas Police Service
  - Greater Sudbury Police Service
  - Halton Regional Police
  - Peel Regional Police
  - Windsor Police Service
- India: Mumbai Police
- Iraq: Iraqi Military
- Pakistan: Sindh Police Agency
- Trinidad and Tobago: Police Service
- United States: M&P9, M&P40, M&P45 and M&P357 pistols have been used by various U.S. police departments
  - Anchorage Police Department (APD, AK)
  - Austin Police Department (APD), M&P40
  - California Highway Patrol (CHP), M&P40
  - Cincinnati Police Department, M&P9
  - Columbus Division of Police (CPD), M&P40 PRO
  - Colorado State Patrol (CSP), M&P40
  - Denver Police Department (DPD)
  - Los Angeles County Sheriff's Department (LASD), M&P9
  - Maricopa County Sheriff (MCSD)
  - Massachusetts State Police (MSP), M&P45
  - Franklin County Sheriff’s Office, Massachusetts (FCSO), M&P40
  - New Hampshire State Police (NHSP) M&P45
  - New Mexico State Police (NMSP) M&P357 & M&P9
  - Oregon State Police (OSP) M&P40
  - Prince George's County Police, Maryland (PGPD, MD) M&P 40, M&P 9, Full Size and Compact
  - San Antonio Police Department (SAPD), M&P40
  - Drug Enforcement Administration (DEA)
  - Vermont State Police (VSP), M&P40
  - Washington State Patrol (M&P40)
  - NC Dept. of Correction (NCDOC), M&P40
  - Westchester County Police (WCPD) M&P Metal 9mm
  - Westchester County Department of Corrections (WCDOC) M&P 2.0 9mm
  - Robbinsdale Police Department (RPD), M&P 9mm 2.0
  - Pennsylvania Office of Attorney General Bureau of Criminal Investigations (BCI), M&P M2.0 Compact 9mm

=== Former ===
- United States:
  - Los Angeles Police Department (LAPD), M&P9, currently being replaced by the newly-issued FN 509 MRD-LE
  - Puerto Rico: M&P40; Puerto Rico Police Department in 2009, currently being replaced by the SIG Sauer P320 9mm
