= Museum of Contemporary Art Tokyo =

Art museum in Tokyo, Japan

Coordinates: 35°40′48″N 139°48′29″E

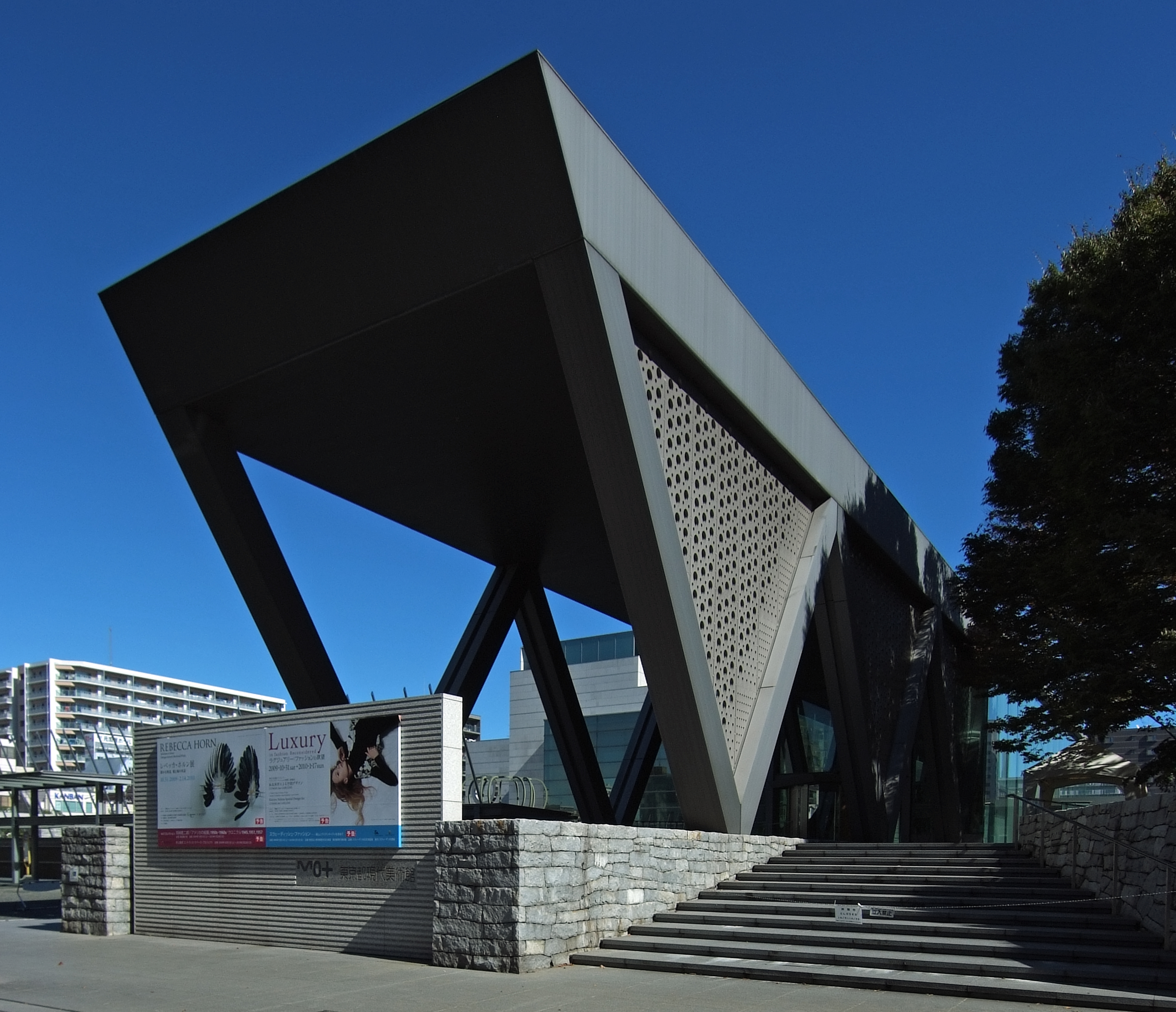
Museum of Contemporary Art Tokyo

The Museum of Contemporary Art Tokyo (東京都現代美術館, Tōkyō-to Gendai Bijutsukan) is a contemporary art museum in Koto, Tokyo, Japan. The museum is located in Kiba Park. Designed by Takahiko Yanagisawa (TAK Associates), the museum was opened in March 1995. With a total floor area of approximately 33,000 square meters, it is one of the largest contemporary art museums in Japan. The permanent collection comprises approximately 5,700 works of art from both Japanese and international artists, ranging from the postwar era to the present day.

== Collections ==
- Marilyn Monroe by Andy Warhol (1967)
- Girl with Hair Ribbon by Roy Lichtenstein (1965)
- Honey-pop by Tokujin Yoshioka (2001)
- Water Block by Tokujin Yoshioka (2002)

== Access ==
The closest railway station is Kiba Station on the Tokyo Metro Tozai Line.
