= Sachio =

- Gender: Male

Origin
- Origin: Japanese
- Meaning: Different meanings depending on the kanji used

Sachio (written: 祥雄, 幸生, 幸夫, 倖生 or 左千夫) is a masculine Japanese given name. Notable people with the name include:

- Itō Sachio (伊藤 左千夫; 1864–1913), pen-name of Itō Kōjirō, Japanese poet and writer
- Sachio Kinugasa (衣笠 祥雄; born 1947), Japanese baseball player
- Sachio Otani (大谷 幸夫; born 1924), Japanese architect
- Sachio Semmoto (千本 倖生; born 1942), Japanese businessman
- Sachio Yoshida (吉田 幸生; born 1980), Japanese footballer
