= Kiba Park =

Park in Koto, Tokyo, Japan

Coordinates: 35°40′34.5″N 139°48′30.3″E

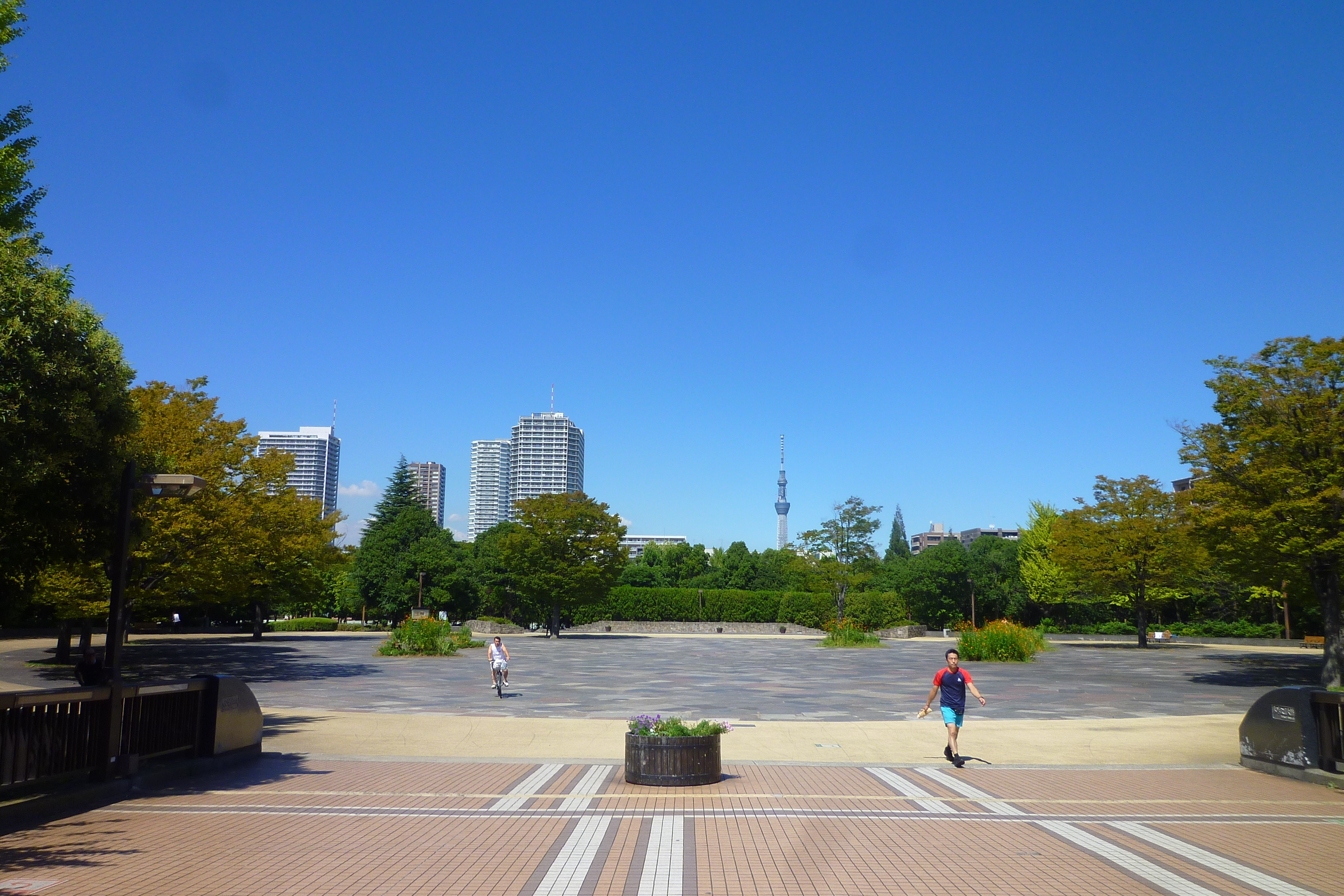
- Park and Tokyo Skytree
- Interactive map of Kiba Park
- Location: Koto, Tokyo, Japan
- Area: 238,711.13 square metres (58.98680 acres)
- Created: June 1, 1992

A map of the general layout of Kiba park

Kiba Park (木場公園, kiba kōen) is a Tokyo metropolitan park in Kōtō, Tokyo. The park includes jogging paths, playgrounds, tennis courts, a BBQ area, and spaces for events. The park is divided into two parts, north and south, connected by a pedestrian bridge. The Museum of Contemporary Art Tokyo is located in this park.

== History ==
After Great fire of Meireki in 1657, timber yard was moved here from Central Tokyo（then Edo）.

In 1969, the Tokyo Metropolitan Government relocated its timber industries and then made the current location into a tree filled park.

== Access ==
General admission is free. It is an 8-minute walk from Kiba Station on the Tokyo Metro Tozai Line.

== See also ==
- Parks and gardens in Tokyo
