= Sachiko Kodama =

Japanese artist (born 1970)

Sachiko Kodama (born 1970) is a Japanese artist. She is best known for her artwork using ferrofluid, a dark colloidal suspension of magnetic nano-particles dispersed in solution which remains strongly magnetic in its fluid. By controlling the fluid with a magnetic field, it is formed to create complex 3-dimensional shapes as a "liquid sculpture".

== Biography ==
Kodama was born in Kagoshima Prefecture and raised in the Shizuoka Prefecture. Kagoshima is the southwestern tip of the Kyushu island of Japan. It is a subtropical area. Its biological diversity greatly inspired her curiosity toward art and science. She graduated in physics at the Department of Science at Hokkaido University in 1993 then shifting her focus, entered the University of Tsukuba's Graduate School of Art and Design. After holding a PhD in art from the University of Tsukuba she has been teaching in the University of Electro-communications in Tokyo as an associate professor.

== Shows and exhibitions ==
Kodama started working in ferrofluid with her project "Protrude, Flow" in 2000, created in collaboration with Minako Takeno. "Protrude, Flow" was exhibited at the SIGGRAPH 2001 Art Gallery, the Skirball Cultural Center in Los Angeles, and the Mood River exhibition held at the Wexner Center for the Arts in Columbus.

In 2010 Kodama exhibited "Morpho Tower" and "Breathing Chaos" at Cyber Arts Japan, a media art exhibition hosted by the Museum of Contemporary Art Tokyo. Matthew Larking described her work as "Sachiko Kodama's small yet powerful piece "Morpho Tower" displays a seemingly organic life form, which is actually ferrofluid dynamically sculpted by electromagnets."

Also, 'Transmutation' Exhibition, Highline Loft, New York 2012.

=== Solo exhibitions ===
1996

- Sachiko Kodama Exhibition, Gallery Kobayashi (Tokyo)

2004

- Sachiko Kodama, Breathing Chaos, Telic Gallery (LA)

2005

- The dynamic fluid – hide and seek for sea urchins – Sachiko Kodama's magnetic fluid art project, Science Museum (Tokyo)

2006

- Sachiko Kodama Morphotower, Gallery Sakamaki (Tokyo)

2008

- Sachiko Kodama Morphotower, Gallery Sakamaki (Tokyo)

2010

- Sachiko Kodama – Invisible Garden, Miraikan (The National Museum of Emerging Science and Innovation (Tokyo))

2011

- Sachiko Kodama – My Little Sea, NC Soft Creative Fountain (Seoul)
- Sachiko Kodama, Input/Output Gallery (Hong Kong)

2012

- Sachiko Kodama – Solo Exhibition, Agora Art Project × Space (Taipei)

2016

- Sachiko Kodama: Ferrofluid Sculpture and Design of New Media Art, Chofu City Cultural Center Tazukuri (Tokyo)

2017

- Sachiko Kodama – Éblouissant, Seikado (Kyoto)

2019

- Sachiko Kodama - On Dazzling, Tokyo Publishing House (Tokyo)

2020

- Open Studio Program 78 Sachiko Kodama: Pulsate – Melting Vision and Melting Moment, Rhythm in Motion, Fuchu Art Museum (Tokyo)

2021

- Sachiko Kodama Nihombashi Takashimaya Art Gallery X (Tokyo)

=== Group exhibitions ===
1998

- Para para parallax exhibition, Gallery NW House (Tokyo)

2001

- Interaction 01 Exhibition, Softopia Japan Center, organizer: IAMAS Institute of Advanced Media Arts and Sciences (Gifu Prefecture)

2002

- Japan Media Arts Exhibition 2002, CAFA (Central Academy of Fine Arts) Art Museum (Beijing)

2004

- Navigator - Digital Art in the Making, National Taiwan Museum of Fine Arts (Taichung)
- Time/Space, Gravity, and Light, Skirball Cultural Center (LA)

2005

- Meta visual: 10e anniversaire du Tokyo Metropolitan Museum of Photography, Centre des Arts d'Enghien-les-Bains (Enghien-les-Bains, France)
- Digital Art Festival Tokyo 2005, Panasonic Center (Tokyo)

2006

- Japan Media Arts Festival, Tokyo Photographic Art Museum (Tokyo)
- Electrical Fantasista, BankART Studio NYK (Yokohama)
- Woman's Perspective in New Media, Bitforms Gallery Seoul (Seoul)

2007

- Contemporary Artists of South Kyushu － Message 2007, Miyakonojo City Museum of Art
- The Power of Expression, JAPAN, The National Art Center (Tokyo)
- Electronic Alive IV, Scarfone Gallery, University of Tampa (FL)
- Japan Media Arts Festival 2007 in Shanghai, Shanghai Sculpture space (Shanghai)
- Haptic Literacture – Intersection of text/media art, Tokyo Photographic Art Museum (Tokyo)

2008

- Sculpture in Motion: Art Choreographed by Nature, Atlanta Botanical Garden
- Machines & Souls, Arte Digital y Nuevos Medios, Museo Nacional Centro de Arte Reina Sofía, MNCARS (Madrid)
- Andy Moses, Sachiko Kodama, Ewerdt Hilgemann, Samuel Freeman Gallery (Santa Monica)
- SIGGRAPH ASIA 2008, Art Gallery – Curated Show, Suntec Singapore International Convention & Exhibition Centre (Singapore)

2009

- Summer vacation for me and art, Ichihara Lakeside Museum (Chiba Prefecture)
- Device Art Exhibition, Ars Electronica Center (Linz)
- Device_art 3.009, Kontejner (Croatia)
- Art Future 2009, Auditorio IMAGINA (Barcelona)

2010

- Ars Electronica – 30 years for Art and Media Technology, The Museum of Contemporary Art Tokyo
- Silicon dreams. Art, Science & Technology in the European Union Tabakelera (San Sebastián)
- Poetry of Motion, Ars Electronica at Automobil Forum Unter den Linden (Berlin)
- Magic Art Museum Exhibition, Oita Art Museum
- Japan Media Arts Festival in Istanbul, Pera Museum (Istanbul)
- Japan Media Arts Festival Travelling Exhibition in Sapporo, Sapporo Art Park (Sapporo)

2011

- Art Futura XXI Alhóndiga Bilbao (Bilbao)
- Left to my own devices, INSPACE (Scotland)
- Magic Art Museum Exhibition, Morioka Civic Cultural Hall (Morioka Prefecture, akehara Museum (Hiroshima)
- Close Your Eyes and Tell Me What You See, Göteborgs konstmuseum (Sweden)
- Close Your Eyes and Tell Me What You See, Vartiovuoren tähtitorni (Finland)

2012

- MEDIA GEIJUTSU Flow & Bright, GYRE (Tokyo)
- Transmurtation, Highline Loft (NY)
- Art Rock Festival, Pavillon des Arts Numériques, Musée de Saint-Brieuc (Saint-Brieuc)
- Turbulence, Espaces Louis Vuitton (Paris)
- Mugendai Art Exhibition, Hamada Children's Museum of Art (Tottori Prefecture)
- Magic Art Museum Exhibition, Yumeminato Tower (Tottori Prefecture), Matsuzakaya Art Museum (Nagoya)

2013

- Japan Media Arts Festival in Yamanashi, Yamanashi Prefectural Library (Yamanashi Prefecture)
- Turbulences II, Villa Empain (Brussels)
- We are in complete control 3:e Våningen (Göteborg)
- Lille 3000, Natures Artificielles, Gare Saint Sauveur (Lille)
- Aomori Earth 2013 － Brave New World – Re-Enchanting Utopia, Aomori Museum of ArtMagic Art Museum Exhibition, Miyazaki Prefectural Art Museum, Contemporary Art Museum, Kumamoto, The Ueno Royal Museum, 21st Century Museum of Contemporary Art, Okayama City Museum
- Design Shanghai 2013, Power Station of Art (Shanghai)

2014

- Boundless Fantasy: Multimedia Art from East Asia, Charles B. Wang Center,
- The State University of New York at Stony Brook (New York)
- Ankoku, Galerie-da end (Paris)

2015

- LIVE: Work from the Collections #5, Chelsea Space, University of the Arts London

2016

- Japan Media Arts Festival 20th Anniversary Exhibition – Power to Change, 3331 Arts Chiyoda (Tokyo)

2017

- ArtFitura Rome: Digital Creature, Ex Dogana (Rome)
- Nuit Blanche KYOTO 2017, Seikado (Kyoto)
- Japan Media Arts Festival in Ishigaki Jima Island (Okinawa)
- Imaginary Guide: Japan, Mystetskyi Arsenal (Kyiv)

2020

- Japan Media Arts Festival in Otaru, Canal Plaza (Otaru)
- Pharmakon Chain Reaction， Atelier Mitsushima (Kyoto)

2021

- Vision Gate Exhibition, Haneda/Narita Airport (Tokyo，Chiba)

=== Other ===
2010

- The Armory Show 2010, Piers 92 & 94 (New York)

2011

- Chanel J12 watch events (Paris, Tokyo, New York)

2015

- Art Paris Art Fair 2015, Galerie-da end (Paris)

== Awards ==
1994

- Fukui International Youth Media Art Festival

1995

- Accepted for International Biennale in Nagoya - ARTEC'95

1997

- Accepted for International Biennale in Nagoya - ARTEC'97

2001

- Accepted for SIGGRAPH 2001 Art Gallery (Los Angeles)

2002

- Awarded Grand Prize of Digital Art (Interactive Art) Division at the 5th Media Art Festival, Agency for Cultural Affairs, Japan
- Digital Content Grand Prix 2001 Grand Prize in Art
- Japan Information-Culturology Society, Art Award

2005

- Accepted for VIDEOEX 2005 International Experimental Film & Video Festival
- Accepted for the Ninth Annual MadCat Women's International Film Festival

2006

- Accepted for SIGGRAPH 2006 Art Gallery (Boston)

2009-2010

- Accepted for Program of Overseas Study for Upcoming Artists by Agency of Cultural Affairs, Government of Japan (New York)

== Commission Works ==
- Ars Electronica Center (Linz, Austria)
- Wonder Museum (Okinawa, Japan)
- National Science Technology Museum (Kaohsiung, Taiwan)
- Panasonic Center Tokyo Creative Museum AkeruE (Tokyo, Japan)
- SpaceLABO (Fukuoka, Japan)

== Collections ==
- Miyakonojo City Museum of Art (Japan)
- Boghossian Foundation (Belgium)
- ArtFutura (Spain)
