= Smith & Wesson Bodyguard =

Family of small, J-frame revolvers

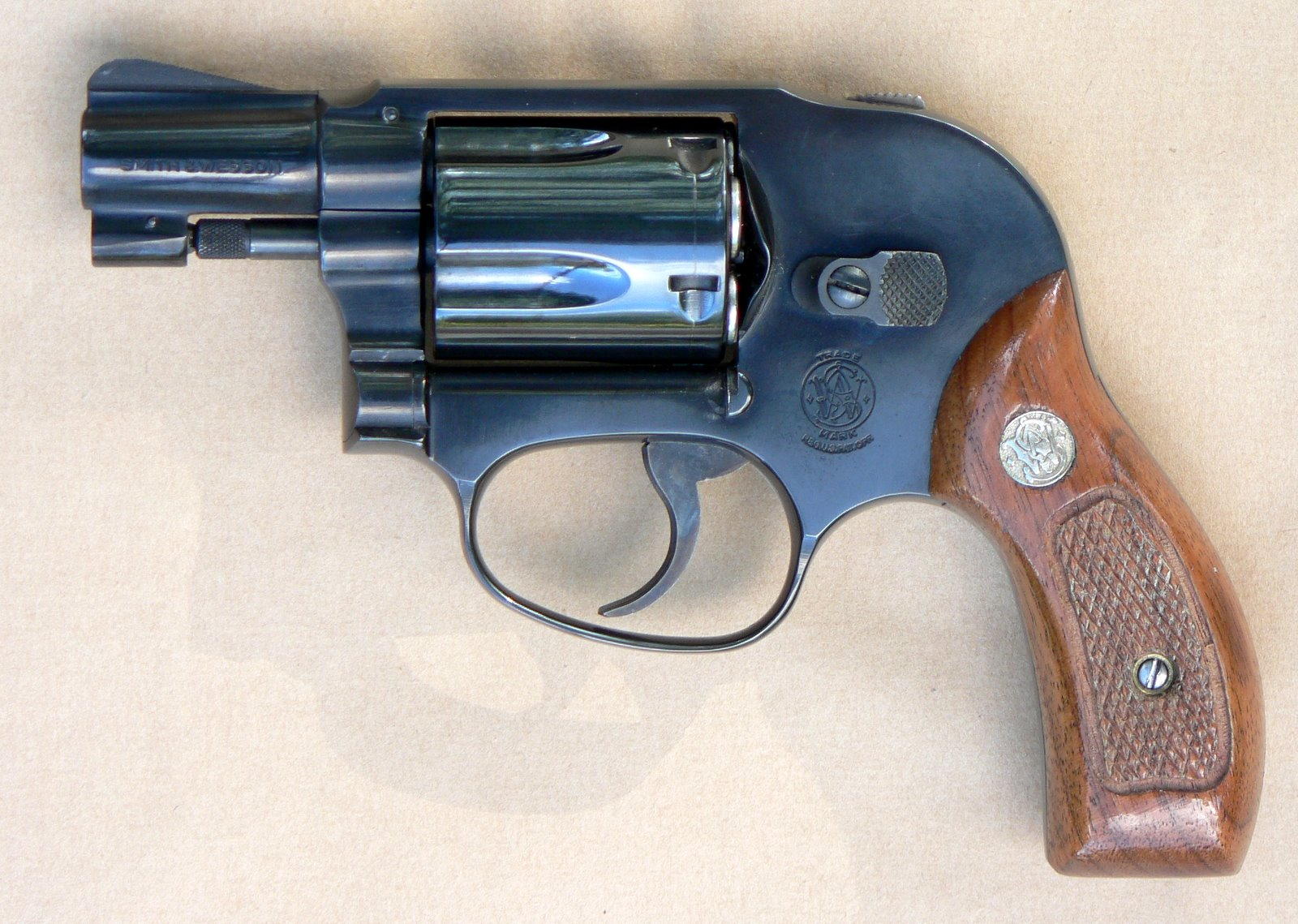
Smith & Wesson Model 49 Bodyguard .38 Special

The Smith & Wesson Bodyguard is a family of small revolvers with shrouded hammers manufactured by Smith & Wesson. They are available chambered in either .38 Special or .357 Magnum.

== Models ==
=== Model 38 ===
The Model 38 is aluminum-framed, has a carbon steel barrel, a carbon steel cylinder with a five-round capacity, and is chambered in .38 Special.

=== Model 49 ===
The Model 49 is an all-carbon-steel-framed revolver chambered in .38 Special.

=== Model 638 ===
The Model 638 is aluminum-framed with stainless steel cylinder and barrel. Chambered in .38 Special.

=== Model 649 ===
The Model 649 is an all stainless-steel framed revolver. Chambered in .357 Magnum or .38 Special.

=== M&P Bodyguard 38 ===
The M&P Bodyguard 38, introduced in 2014, is the latest incarnation of a Smith & Wesson revolver using the Bodyguard name.

It is a polymer framed revolver chambered in .38 Special, and available with a Crimson Trace (previously Insight) red-dot laser sight integrated in to the grip. Like previous Bodyguard models, it has a five-round cylinder and a concealed hammer but unlike the previous models, the hammer cannot be cocked for single action fire.

The lockwork is different than any other Smith & Wesson revolver and the model has no parts interchangeable with the J-frame series.

In 2018, S&W announced a new version of the Bodyguard which lacks the integrated laser sight. It is most closely related to the Centennial models.

== Users ==
- United States
  - Massachusetts State Police
    - Plainclothes officers
  - Clyde A. Tolson, special assistant to FBI chief J. Edgar Hoover, owned a Model 38 Airweight, serial number 512236, with his name engraved on the side.

=== Former users ===
- Kingdom of Laos
  - During the Laotian Civil War
    - Royal Lao Army (RLA)
    - Royal Lao Police (PRL)
- Rhodesia
  - During the Rhodesian Bush War
    - Civilians
    - Air Rhodesia aircrews
- South Vietnam
  - During the Vietnam War
    - Army of the Republic of Vietnam (ARVN)
    - Republic of Vietnam National Police (CSQG)
- Portugal
  - During the Portuguese Colonial War
    - Civilians
    - Government officials

== Criminal activities ==
- Nguyễn Ngọc Loan, South Vietnam's chief of National Police, was photographed & filmed using a Model 49 Bodyguard to execute a Viet Cong prisoner, Nguyễn Văn Lém, during the Tet Offensive of 1968.
- Bernhard Goetz used a Model 38 Bodyguard in the controversial 1984 New York City Subway shooting.

== See also ==
- Smith & Wesson Bodyguard 380
- Smith & Wesson Centennial
- Smith & Wesson Model 36

== Bibliography ==
- António José Telo and Mário Álvares, Armamento do Exército Português Vol. I – Armamento ligeiro, Prefácio, Lisbon 2004. ISBN 972-8816-43-X (in Portuguese)
- Valéry Tarrius, La Police de Campagne du Sud-Vietnam 1967–1975, in Armes Militaria Magazine No. 236, March 2005, Histoire & Collections, Paris, pp. 37–43. ISSN 0753-1877 (in French)
- Peter Gerard Locke & Peter David Farquharson Cooke, Fighting Vehicles and Weapons of Rhodesia 1965-80, P&P Publishing, Wellington (New Zealand) 1995. ISBN 0-473-02413-6
