= Antoni Abad =

Spanish artist (born 1956)

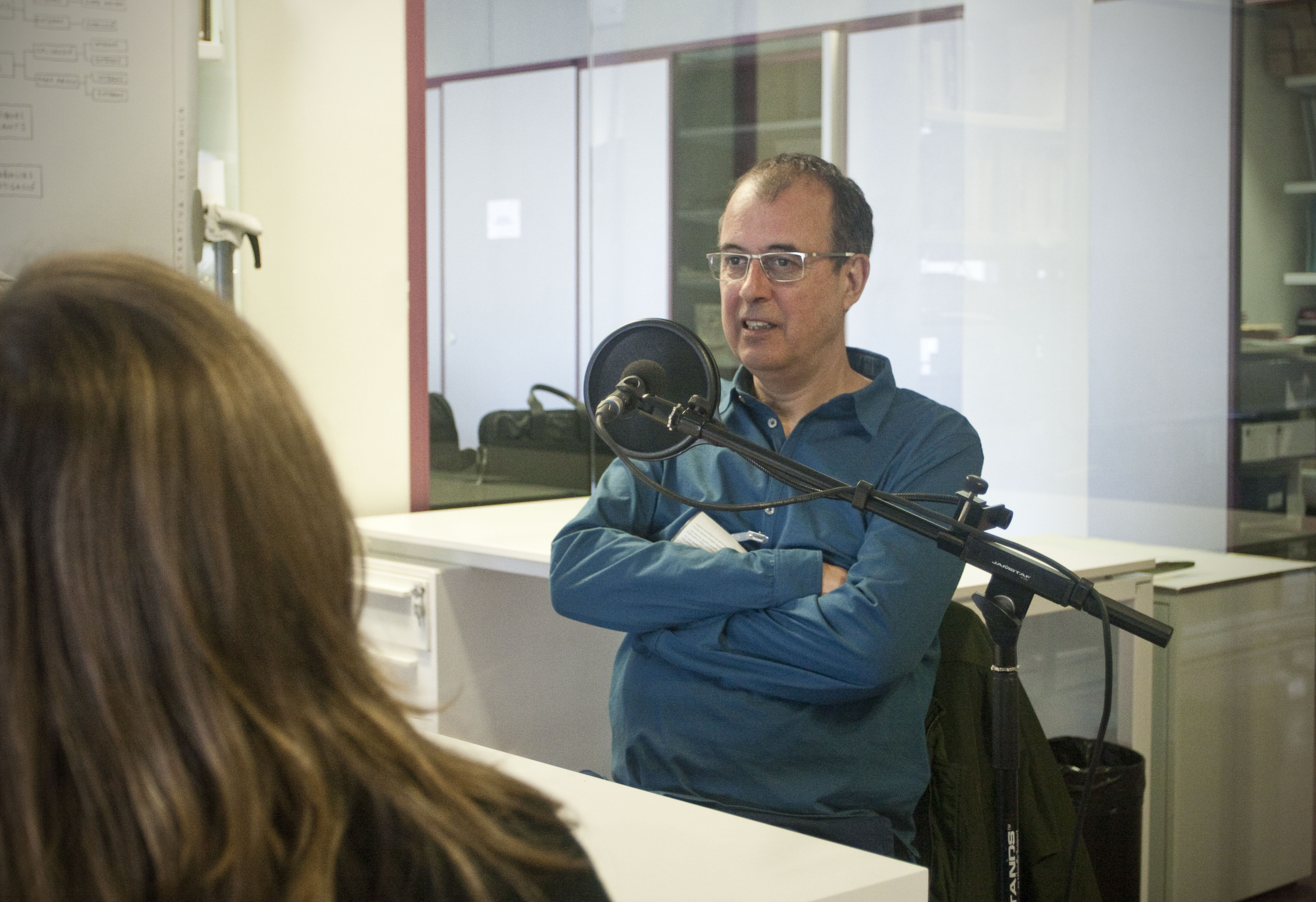
Antoni Abad talking at Radio Web MACBA.

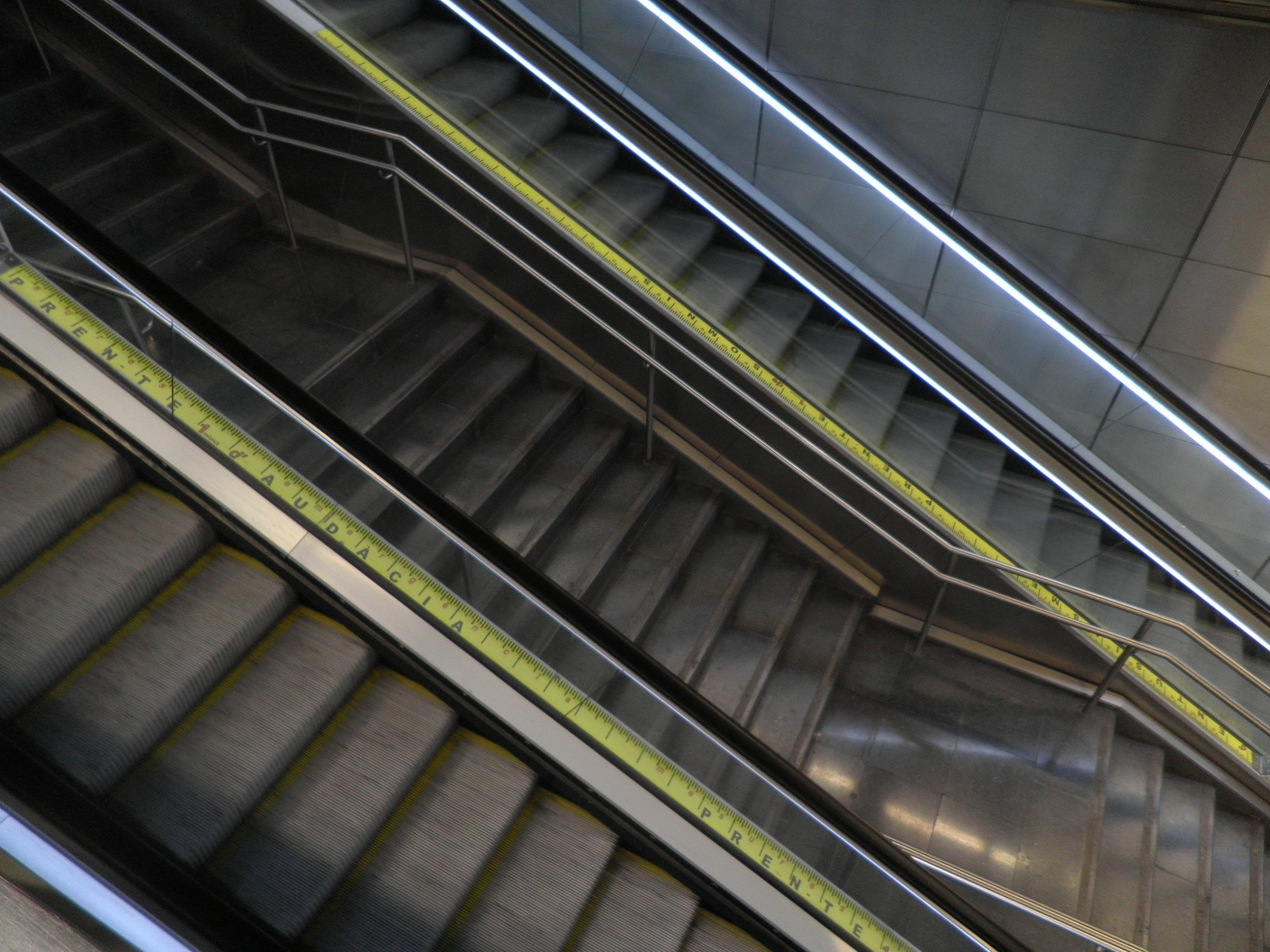
Abad's installation, "Mesures d'emergència" (Emergency Measures, 2010) in the Barcelona metro's Vall d'Hebron station.

Antoni Abad i Roses (born 1956 in Lleida) is a Spanish artist. He began his career as a sculptor, and evolved over time towards video art and later in net.art and other forms of new media, including electronic literature.

== Biography ==
Abad was born in 1956 in Lleida, Spain. Abad's artistic training began with the teachings of his father, followed by a degree in Art History from the University of Barcelona (1979), and studies of engraving in Cuenca, London and Perugia.

== Art career ==
His work has evolved away from a traditional sculptural practice to the use of new technologies, and in particular the creation of community-based artworks using cell phones. He moved also from photography to video art, followed by interest in computers Net.art. He uses Internet as a creative & research platform. Antoni Abad's expresses the desire to formal experimentation around the concepts of space and time, always present in his work, not exempt lately of certain ironic and critical aspects.

== Exhibitions ==
Some of his most important exhibits:

- 1986 — Espai 10 (Fundació Joan Miró) Escultures mal·leables
- 1991 — Premi d'Arts Plàstiques Medalla Morera. Museu d'Art Jaume Morera. June
- 1997 — Medidas de emergencia. Espacio Uno, Museo Nacional Centro de Arte Reina Sofía, Madrid.
- 1999 — Museo de Arte Moderno de Buenos Aires & Venice Biennale.
- 2003 — The Real Royal Trip. P.S.1. – Museum of Modern Art, New York.
- 2006 — Centre d'Art Santa Mònica, Barcelona.
- 2014 — megafone.net/2004-2014, MACBA.
- 2017 — Venice Biennale.

== Awards ==
- Premi d'Arts Plàstiques Medalla Morera (medal) 1990
- Premi Ciutat de Barcelona (City of Barcelona Prize) in the category of Multimedia (2002) for his work Z, shown in Metrònom and Centre d'Art Santa Monica
- Golden Nica at Ars Electronica within the category of virtual communities in 2006. Considered the most important prize in the world in terms of art and new technologies.
- Premi Nacional d'Arts Visuals (National Prize for Visual Arts) in 2006 given by the Government of Catalonia.
