= Bodyguard Kiba =

Bodyguard Kiba may refer to:

- Bodyguard Kiba, a manga by author Ikki Kajiwara
- Bodyguard Kiba (1973 film), a 1973 film directed by Ryuichi Takamori starring Sonny Chiba
- Bodyguard Kiba (1993 film), a 1993 film directed by Takashi Miike
