= Smith & Wesson Bodyguard 380 =

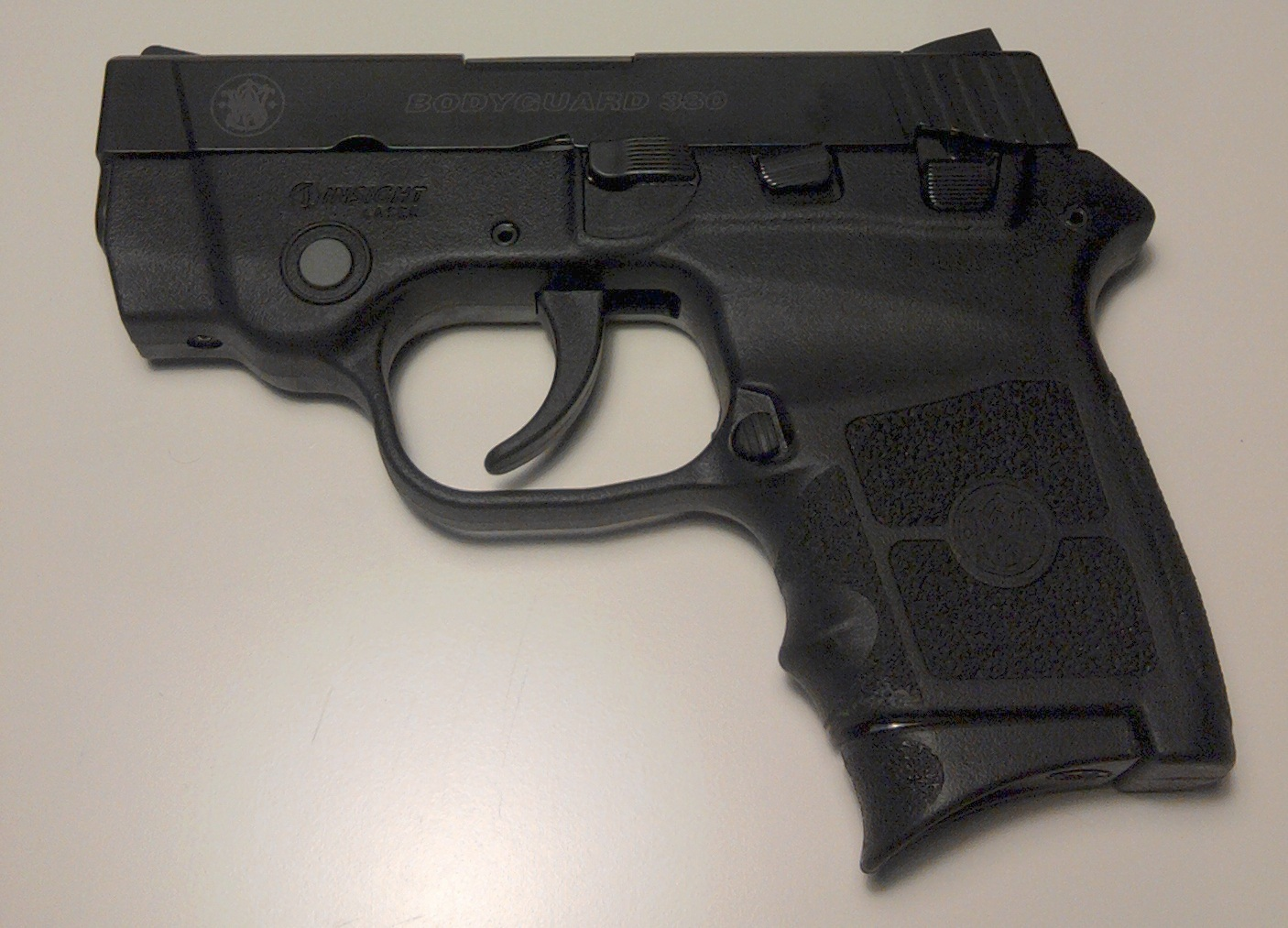
- Type: Semi-automatic pistol
- Place of origin: United States

Production history
- Manufacturer: Smith & Wesson
- Unit cost: $419 MSRP
- Produced: 2011–2021

Specifications
- Mass: 11.85 oz (336 g)
- Length: 5.25 in (13.3 cm)
- Barrel length: 2.75 in (7.0 cm)
- Cartridge: .380 ACP
- Action: Short recoil
- Feed system: 6-round box magazine
- Sights: Fixed open sights, Laser sight

The Smith & Wesson Bodyguard 380 is a compact semi-automatic pistol produced by Smith & Wesson chambered for the .380 ACP cartridge.

== Design details ==
The frame of the Bodyguard 380 is made of polymer, while the barrel, slide and internal parts are made from steel. The trigger is double-action only. Early versions of the Bodyguard 380 had an integrated INSIGHT laser sight. Recent M&P-branded versions are available without the laser sight, or have a built-in Crimson Trace brand laser.

The design incorporates various features normally seen on larger pistols, including the aforementioned laser sight as well as a frame mounted safety and slide release. These additional features contribute to its higher base cost than other weapons of comparable size and caliber. However, new versions in the M&P line without the laser sight and frame mounted safety are also available at a lower cost.

== M&P Bodyguard 380 ==
In 2014, Smith & Wesson introduced the M&P Bodyguard 380 to replace the Bodyguard 380. The M&P Bodyguard 380 is functionally identical to its predecessor but is now considered a part of the Smith & Wesson M&P ("Military and Police") line of pistols. The first M&P branded Bodyguard, the 380 removes the integral laser sight of the previous pistol and brings the aesthetics in line with the rest of the M&P product line, specifically the "fish scale" slide grip and more aggressive texture on the hand grip. A second version, the M&P Bodyguard 380 Crimson Trace, reintroduced a model with an integrated laser, but instead of Insight, the laser supplier is Crimson Trace and the laser button is now red instead of gray and also incorporates the updated slide and hand grips. Unlike the rest of the M&P pistols, the M&P Bodyguard 380 is not striker fired. It is a traditional double-action-only hammer-fired pistol intended for personal protection, concealed carry or as a law enforcement "back-up" handgun. Some models incorporate a manual safety.

== See also ==
- Kel-Tec P-3AT
- Ruger LCP
