= Timeline of Barcelona =

The following is a timeline of the history of the city of Barcelona, Catalonia, Spain.

== Prior 19th century ==
- 218 BCE – Barcino established by Hamilcar Barca a Carthaginian general and statesman.
- 133 BCE – Romans in power.
- 343 CE – Bishopric established.
- 414 – Visigoth Ataulphus headquartered in Barcelona.
- 713 – Arabs in power.
- 801 – Siege of Barcelona, Franks in power; County of Barcelona established.
- 874 – The counts of Barcelona ruled as independent monarchs.
- 897 – Guifré el Pilós, Count of Barcelona, dies with his sons inheriting his possessions instead of an appointment of the Frank's king, making the end of Franks effective rule
- 1164 – Dynastic union of Barcelona with Aragon (composite monarchy).
- 1243 – Arsenals built (approximate date).
- 1258 – Consolat de Mar (maritime legal code) issued.
- 1298 – Barcelona Cathedral construction begins.
- 1359 – June: Battle of Barcelona (1359).
- 1378 – Casa Consistorial built.
- 1383 – Llotja del Mar (exchange) built.
- 1391 – Santa Maria del Pi church built.
- 1392 – Public clock installed (approximate date).
- 1400 – Medical college established.
- 1401
  - Taula de canvi de Barcelona (public bank) established.
  - General hospital active.
- 1448 – Barcelona Cathedral construction completed.
- 1450 – University of Barcelona founded.
- 1473 – Printing press in use.
- 1474 – Moll de la Santa Creu (wharf) construction begins.
- 1493 – Columbus' published description of his trans-Atlantic trip becomes a "bestseller" in Barcelona.
- 1529 – Charles V and Clement VII sign treaty in Barcelona.
- 1609 – Bank of Barcelona established.
- 1640 – Reapers' War: Corpus de Sang events.
- 1641 – January: Battle of Montjuïc.
- 1651 – July: Siege of Barcelona begins.
- 1697 – August: Siege of Barcelona (1697).
- 1705 – September–October: Siege of Barcelona (1705).
- 1706 – April: Siege of Barcelona (1706).
- 1708 – Premiere of Caldara's opera Il più bel nome.^{(ca)}
- 1713 – July: Siege of Barcelona (1713–14) begins.
- 1715 – Citadel built to suppress Catalan revolts (Ciutadella de Barcelona).
- 1792 – Custom house built.

== 19th century ==
- 1809 – French in power.
- 1831 - Bonaplata Factory, El Vapor founded
- 1833 – City becomes capital of newly created Province of Barcelona.
- 1834 – Sociedad Económica Barcelonesa de Amigos del País established.
- 1842 – Bombardment of Barcelona (1842).
- 1843 – La Jamància insurrection
- 1847
  - Gran Teatre del Liceu opens.
  - Barcelona City Hall expanded.
- 1848
  - Mataró-Barcelona railway begins operating.
  - Institut Industrial de Catalunya founded.
  - Municipal Archives of Barcelona moves into City Hall.
- 1849 - La España Industrial el Vapor Nou begins operation in Sants
- 1854
  - City walls dismantled (approximate date).
  - Burning of the Monasteries
  - The Luddite Conflict of the selfactinas
- 1855 - first general strike
- 1857 – Population: 183,787.
- 1859 – Floral Games begin.
- 1869 – 25 September: "Republican insurrection."
- 1877 – Parc de la Ciutadella established from the old citadel.
- 1881
  - La Vanguardia newspaper begins publication.
  - Premiere of Joan Goula's Catalan-language opera A la voreta del mar.
- 1882 – Gaudi's Sagrada Família cathedral construction begins.
- 1887 – Population: 272,481.
- 1888 – 1888 Barcelona Universal Exposition held; Arc de Triomf and Castle of the Three Dragons built.
- 1891 – Orfeó Català chorus formed.
- 1897
  - Eixample district laid out.
  - Els Quatre Gats cafe in business.
- 1899 – Futbol Club Barcelona formed.
- 1900
  - Picasso's first solo art exhibit held.
  - Population: 533,000.

== 20th century ==
- 1901 – Regionalist League headquartered in city.
- 1903 – Palau Robert (residence) built on Passeig de Gràcia.
- 1905 – Jaussely's city plan introduced.
- 1906
  - Republican Nationalist Centre and Catalan Solidarity (1906) headquartered in city.
  - Catalan language congress held.
- 1908
  - Radical Republican Party headquartered in city.
  - Palau de la Música Catalana (concert hall) opens.
- 1909 – July: Tragic Week (Spain).
- 1910
  - Confederación Nacional del Trabajo (union) founded in Barcelona.
  - Les Arts i les Artistes (group) formed.
  - Gaudi's art nouveau Casa Milà built.
- 1913
  - Sants market built.
  - Escola Catala d'Art Dramatic (school) established.
- 1914
  - National Library of Catalonia established.
  - Park Güell built.
- 1918 – Majestic Hotel Inglaterra in business.
- 1919 – Danone yogurt manufactory turn business.
- 1919 – La Canadenca strike, a successful 44 day general strike for the 8-hour-day
- 1920 – Population: 710,335.
- 1921 – 8 March: Politician Dato assassinated.
- 1922
  - Publicat newspaper begins publication.
  - Pathe Cinema opens.
  - Historical Archive of the City of Barcelona opens in the Casa de l'Ardiaca.
- 1923 – 13 September: Coup; Primo de Rivera in power.
- 1924 – Barcelona Metro begins operating.
- 1925 – Salvador Dalí's first solo art exhibit held.
- 1929
  - 1929 Barcelona International Exposition held; Palau Nacional built.
  - Cafe de l'Opera in business.
- 1930 – Population: 1,005,565.
- 1931 – Catalan Republic proclaimed on 14 April by Francesc Macià, replaced three days later by de Generalitat.
- 1932
  - Fira de Barcelona established.
  - Le Corbusier's city plan introduced.
  - The Cortes of the Republic grants self-governance to Catalonia.
- 1933 – Boadas bar in business.
- 1934
  - Cine Verdi opens.
  - Events of 6 October.
  - National Art Museum of Catalonia inaugurated.
- 1936
  - July 1936 military uprising in Barcelona.
  - Cine New-York (cinema) opens.
- 1937 – May Days.
- 1938 – March: Bombing of Barcelona by nationalist forces.
- 1939 – Franco in power.
- 1943 – Barcelona City History Museum inaugurated.
- 1948 – Dau al Set cultural group active.
- 1951 – Barcelona tram strike
- 1955 – 1955 Mediterranean Games.
- 1957
  - Camp Nou (FC Barcelona stadium) opens.
  - Josep Maria de Porcioles i Colomer becomes mayor.
- 1963 – Museu Picasso opens.
- 1968
  - Instituto Politécnico Superior and La Claca puppet theatre established.
  - Autonomous University of Barcelona established.
- 1970 – Population: 1,745,142.
- 1971 – Parc del Laberint d'Horta opens.
- 1973 – Enric Massó i Vázquez becomes mayor.
- 1974
  - Barcelona Metropolitan Corporation created.
  - Dalí Theatre and Museum opened.
- 1975 – Fundación Joan Miró built.
- 1976 – Festival Grec de Barcelona begins.
- 1978 – Barcelona International Centre of Photography inaugurated.
- 1982
  - Pasqual Maragall becomes mayor.
  - Part of 1982 FIFA World Cup football contest held in Barcelona.
- 1986 – Barcelona Metròpolis magazine begins publication and the city was chosen to host the 1992 Summer Olympics.
- 1987
  - 19 June: Hipercor bombing.
  - Parc de la Creueta del Coll established. and the city sign an agreement to host the 1992 Summer Paralympics
- 1989 – European Institute for the Mediterranean established.
- 1990
  - Population: 1,707,286.
  - 18 June: Pompeu Fabra University established.
- 1992 – 1992 Summer Olympics and the 1992 Summer Paralympics were held.
- 1995
  - First Manga Barcelona.
  - Barcelona Museum of Contemporary Art established.
  - Open University of Catalonia established.
- 1997 – Joan Clos becomes mayor.
- 1999 – L'Auditori opens and the Final of the UEFA Champions League at Camp Nou

== 21st century ==
- 2004
  - 2004 Universal Forum of Cultures.
  - Trambaix and Trambesòs opened to the public.
  - September: World Urban Forum held.
  - 2004 Universal Forum of Cultures held.
  - Barcelona Institute of International Studies established.
- 2005 – Torre Agbar built.
- 2006
  - 4F case.
  - Jordi Hereu becomes mayor.
- 2007 – Bicing bikeshare program launched.
- 2008
  - Madrid–Barcelona high-speed rail line inaugurated.
  - Subway terror plot foiled.
- 2009
  - W Barcelona Hotel built.
  - 19 January: 1st Gaudí Awards.
  - Estadi RCDE (stadium) opens.
- 2010
  - 10 July: 2010 Catalan autonomy protest.
  - Sister city relationship established with San Francisco, California.
  - Sagrada Familia church is consecrated by Pope Benedict XVI. Its construction began in 1882 and is still underway, as of 2026.
- 2011
  - Caixabank founded.
  - Xavier Trias elected mayor.
  - Population: 1,620,943.
- 2012 – 11 September: 2012 Catalan independence demonstration.
- 2015
  - 1 April: Barcelona Supercomputing Center established.
  - 20 April: Barcelona school killing.
  - 24 May: Barcelona City Council election, 2015 held; Ada Colau elected mayor.
- 2016 Barcelona Metro line 9 connecting to the airport finished.
- 2017
  - 18 February: Volem acollir protests.
  - 28 July: 2017 Barcelona train crash.
  - 17 August: Barcelona attacks.
  - The Parliament of Catalonia declares the independence from Spain.
- 2019 – 2019 Catalan protests.
- 2020 – 25 January: COVID-19 pandemic begins.
- 2023
  - Sister city relationship suspended with Tel Aviv, Israel.
  - 28 May: 2023 Barcelona City Council election held; Jaume Collboni elected mayor.

== See also ==
- History of Barcelona
- List of mayors of Barcelona
- Timeline of Catalan history

Other cities in the autonomous community of Catalonia:^{(ca)}

- Timeline of Lleida

== Bibliography ==
Published in the 19th century

- M.M. Noah (1819), "(Barcelona)", Travels in England, France, Spain, and the Barbary States, New-York: Kirk and Mercein, hdl:2027/nyp.33433081557641, OCLC 1338665
- Josiah Conder (1830), "Barcelona", The Modern Traveller, London: J.Duncan
- David Brewster, ed. (1830). "Barcelona". Edinburgh Encyclopædia. Edinburgh: William Blackwood.
- Bernard Bolingbroke Woodward; William Leist Readwin Cates (1872). "Barcelona". Encyclopedia of Chronology. Longmans, Green and Company.
- John Ramsay McCulloch (1880), "Barcelona", in Hugh G. Reid (ed.), A Dictionary, Practical, Theoretical and Historical of Commerce and Commercial Navigation, London: Longmans, Green, and Co.

Published in the 20th century

- "Barcelona", Spain and Portugal (3rd ed.), Leipsic: Karl Baedeker, 1908, OCLC 1581249
- "Barcelona (Spanish city)" . Encyclopædia Britannica. Vol. 3 (11th ed.). 1910. pp. 391–393.
- Benjamin Vincent (1910), "Barcelona", Haydn's Dictionary of Dates (25th ed.), London: Ward, Lock & Co.
- Nathaniel Newnham Davis (1911), "Barcelona", The Gourmet's Guide to Europe (3rd ed.), London: Grant Richards
- "Barcelona". Satchel Guide to Spain and Portugal. Boston: Houghton Mifflin. 1930. hdl:2027/mdp.39015024367917.
- George Orwell (1938). Homage to Catalonia.
- Robert Hughes (1992). Barcelona.
- Felipe Fernández-Armesto (1992). Barcelona: A Thousand Years of the City's Past. Oxford University Press. ISBN 978-0-19-285273-1.
- Michael D. Phillips (1995). "Barcelona". In Trudy Ring (ed.). Southern Europe. International Dictionary of Historic Places. Vol. 3. Fitzroy Dearborn. ISBN 1884964028.

Published in the 21st century

- "Barcelona". Understanding Slums: Case Studies for the Global Report 2003. United Nations Human Settlements Programme and University College London. 2003.
- Anton Kreukels; et al., eds. (2005). "Barcelona". Metropolitan Governance and Spatial Planning: Comparative Case Studies of European City-Regions. Routledge. ISBN 978-1-134-49606-8.
- Joan Ramon Resina (2008). Barcelona's Vocation of Modernity: Rise and Decline of an Urban Image. Stanford University Press. ISBN 978-0-8047-5832-1.
- Albert Serratosa (2010). "The eixample (ensanche) of Barcelona (1859 and after)". In Christian Hermansen Cordua (ed.). Manifestoes and Transformations in the Early Modernist City. Ashgate Publishing. ISBN 978-0-7546-7948-6.
- Aránzazu Ascunce Arenas (2012). "Chronology". Barcelona and Madrid: Social Networks of the Avant-Garde. Lexington Books. ISBN 978-1-61148-424-3.
- David Gilmour (2012). "Barcelona". Cities of Spain. Random House. ISBN 978-1-4481-3833-3.
- Montserrat Miller (2015). Feeding Barcelona, 1714-1975: Public Market Halls, Social Networks, and Consumer Culture. USA: Louisiana State University Press. ISBN 978-0-8071-5647-6.
