= 2017 Barcelona attacks =

Terrorist attacks in Spain in August 2017

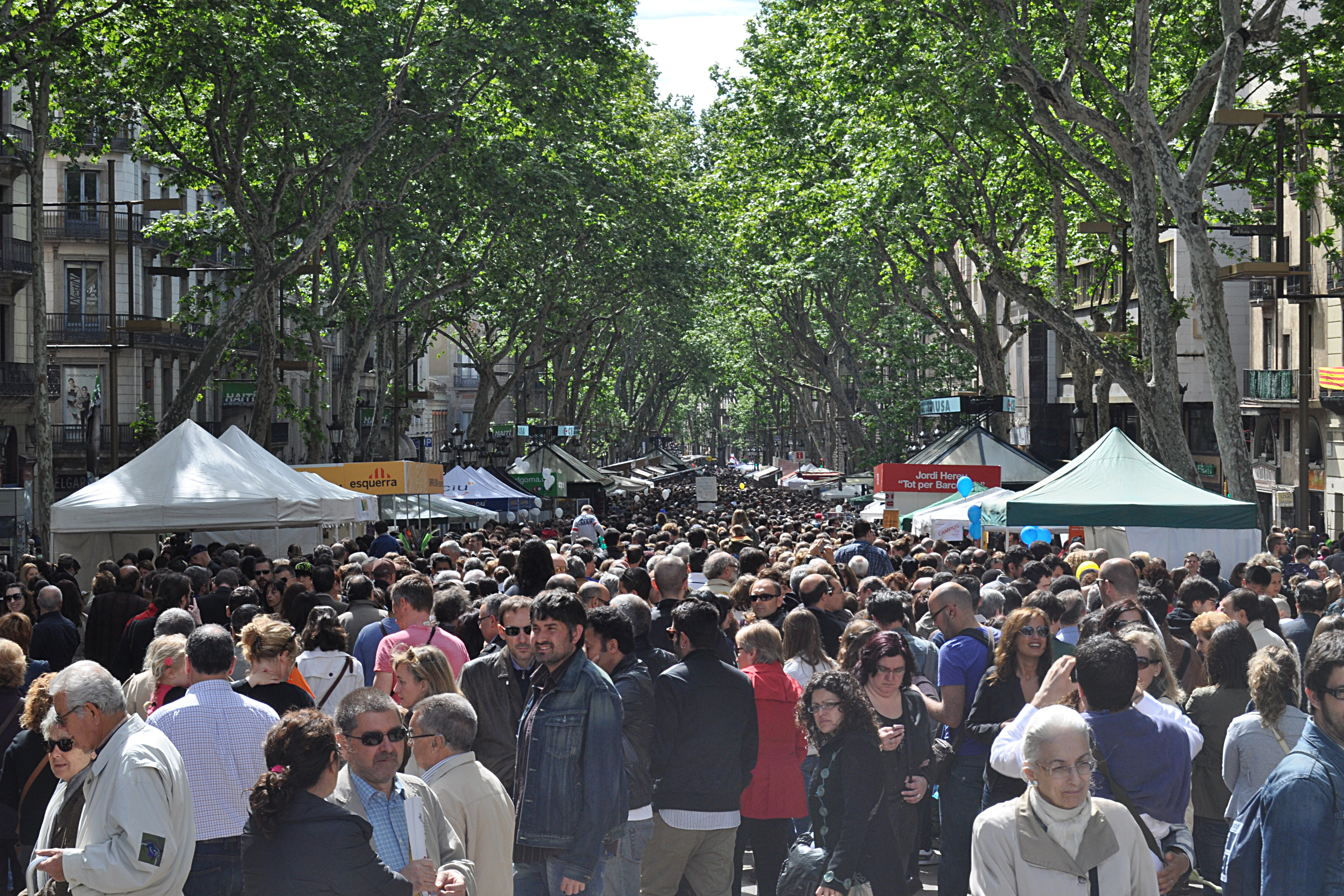
- La Rambla, the site of the van attack; pictured in 2011

- Location: La Rambla: 41°22′53″N 2°10′23″E; Cambrils: 41°22′53″N 2°10′23″E; Alcanar: 40.580919°N 0.553046°E; Subirats: 41.384722°N 1.798056°E; La Rambla, Barcelona and Cambrils, Catalonia, Spain
- Date: 17–18 August 2017; 16:54–01:15 CEST (UTC+2)
- Target: Pedestrians
- Attack type: Vehicle-ramming attack, stabbing, mass murder
- Weapons: Alcanar: Acetone peroxide, gas cylinders (accidental explosion); Barcelona: Fiat Talento and a knife Cambrils: Audi A3, knives and axe
- Deaths: 24 (including 8 attackers)
- Injuries: 152
- No. of participants: 8
- Motive: Islamic extremism

On the afternoon of 17 August 2017, 22-year-old Younes Abouyaaqoub drove a van into a crowd of pedestrians on La Rambla street in Barcelona, Catalonia, Spain, killing 13 people and injuring at least 130 others, one of whom died as a result of the injuries ten days later, on 27 August. Abouyaaqoub fled the attack on foot, then killed another person in order to steal the victim's car and escape. He was later killed by police in Subirats, a town 31 kilometres (19 mi) west of Barcelona, on 21 August.

Nine hours after the Barcelona attack, five more men, thought to be members of the same terrorist cell, drove into another group of pedestrians in nearby Cambrils, killing one woman and injuring six. All five of these attackers were shot and killed by police.

The night before the Barcelona attack, an explosion occurred in a house in the Catalan town of Alcanar, destroying the building and killing two members of the terrorist cell, including the 40-year-old imam thought to be the mastermind behind the coordinated attacks. The home was found to have contained more than 120 gas canisters, which police believe the cell was attempting to convert into either one large bomb or three smaller bombs, to be transported by rental van and detonated in additional attacks, but that the explosives were accidentally detonated.

The Prime Minister of Spain, Mariano Rajoy, called the attack in Barcelona a jihadist attack. Amaq News Agency attributed indirect responsibility for the attack to the Islamic State. The attacks were the deadliest in Spain since the 2004 Madrid train bombings and the deadliest in Barcelona since the 1987 Hipercor bombing.

A 2022 statement by former Spanish police commissioner José Manuel Villarejo in the Spanish High Court appeared to suggest that the Spanish National Intelligence Service was aware of, and potentially involved in, the attacks. However, others have since dismissed his claim as a conspiracy theory.

== Attacks ==
=== Van attack on pedestrians in La Rambla ===
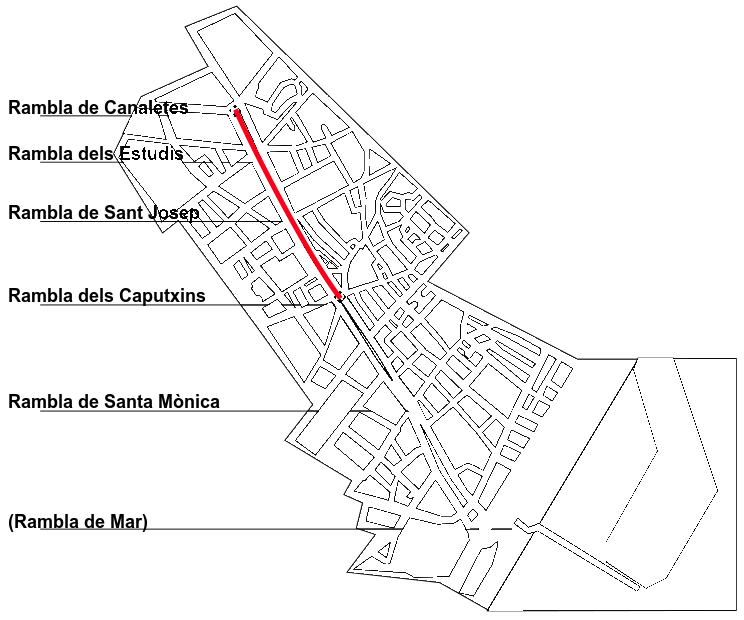
Distance covered by the van, during the attack.

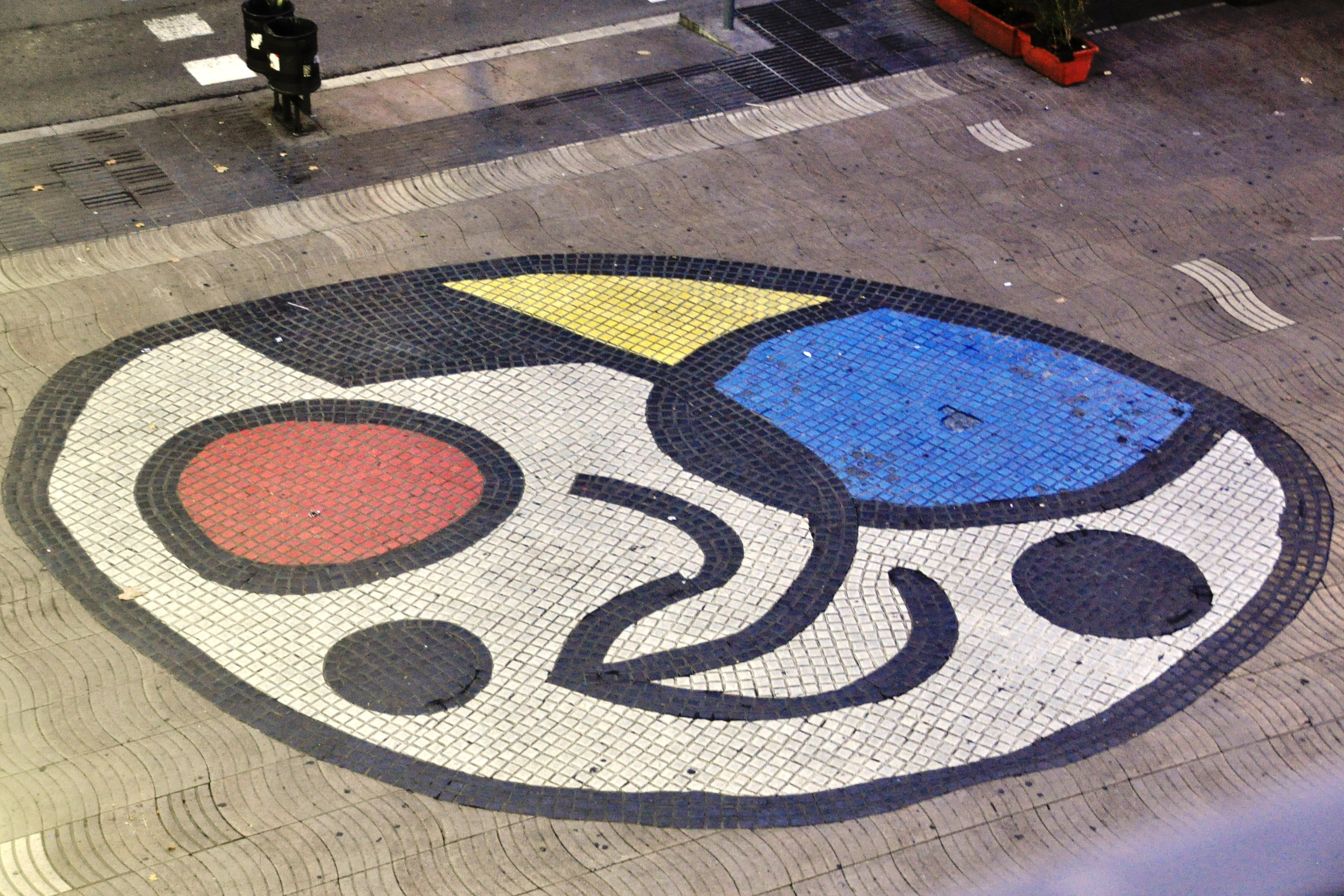
"Paviment Miró" - where the van stopped after the attack in Las Ramblas

At 16:56 CEST (UTC+2) on 17 August 2017, Younes Abouyaaqoub drove a white Fiat Talento van onto the pavement of Barcelona's La Rambla, crashing into pedestrians for about 550 metres (1,800 ft) between Plaça de Catalunya and Liceu before stopping on the Joan Miró mosaic. Witnesses said the vehicle zigzagged at high speed down the street, ramming pedestrians and cyclists.

The numerous impacts the van had received caused the airbag to inflate and the driver protection system to automatically shut down the electrical system of the van, causing it to halt. In the confusion, Abouyaaqoub was able to get away. He fled on foot and made his way to the university district before hijacking a car and stabbing the driver to death.

The van used in the La Rambla attack was rented in the neighbouring area of Santa Perpètua de Mogoda, along with a similar van, considered to be a getaway vehicle, and found by 19:00 in Vic. Younes Abouyaaqoub's credit card was used to pay for the van rental.

In a police press conference at 19:00 local time, a spokesperson confirmed the terrorist nature of the event.

=== Ramming of a police barricade on Avinguda Diagonal ===
About two hours after the attack on La Rambla, a white Ford Focus rammed a police checkpoint in Avinguda Diagonal, at the exit of Barcelona, leaving an officer of the Mossos d'Esquadra injured. The vehicle fled to a neighboring area, Sant Just Desvern, and the driver abandoned the car near the building known as Walden 7. The police found a man stabbed to death in the rear seat who, they believe, was murdered by the Ramblas driver who had escaped by hijacking the car.

=== Related events ===
==== Alcanar explosions ====
===== First explosion =====
On August 16, the day before the Barcelona attacks, an explosion destroyed a house in Alcanar, with one dead reported and seven injured people. Abdelbaki Es Satty and another man, Youssef Aallaa, died in the Alcanar explosion.

Police initially thought it was an accidental gas explosion, but hours later believed the explosion was caused by stockpiled explosives accidentally going off. A Moroccan man was injured in the explosion and taken to the hospital. The explosive TATP and 120 canisters of butane and propane were found inside the house. Catalan bomb squads carried out a controlled explosion at the property where the gas canisters were stored. There was speculation that the terrorists intended to take trucks loaded with explosives and combustible gas to attack the Sagrada Família.

Police said they were working under the hypothesis that the terrorists shot in Cambrils were connected to the Barcelona attack and Alcanar explosions. Police chief Josep Lluís Trapero believed terrorists were in the process of manipulating the gas canisters when they exploded, after which they decided to continue their plans by conducting more rudimentary vehicle ramming attacks.

===== Second explosion =====
A second explosion occurred at the same location during excavation, possibly caused by a spark from a backhoe igniting a gas canister among the debris. At least nine people were injured, with one police officer in critical condition.

==== Cambrils attack ====
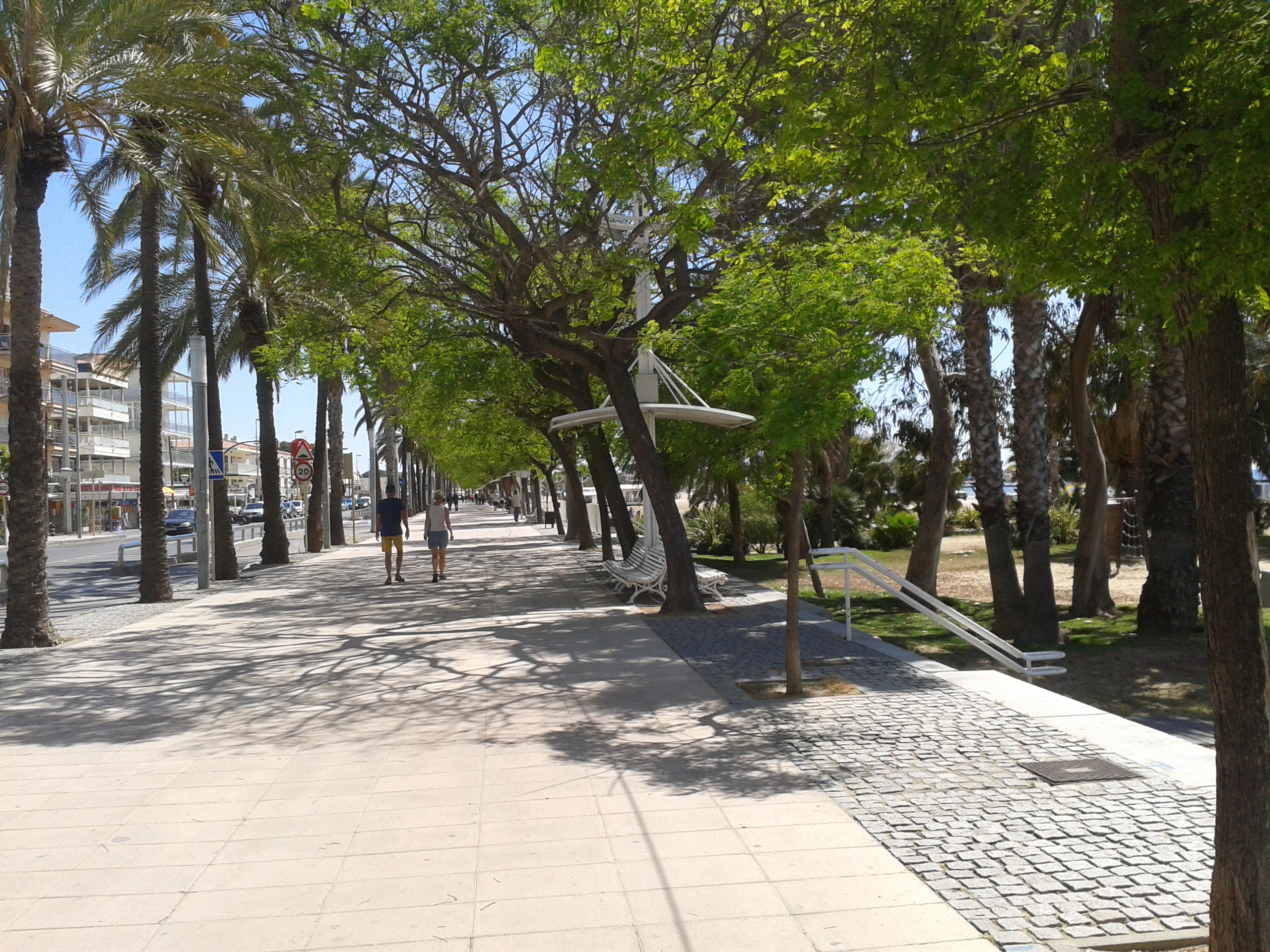
Passeig Marítim – the location of the second car attack

At about 21:30 on 17 August, Houssaine Abouyaaqoub, Omar Hichamy, Mohamed Hichamy, Moussa Oukabir, and Said Aalla were seen on a security camera at a local shop purchasing four knives and one axe.

At around 1:00 am on 18 August in Cambrils, the five men drove an Audi A3 automobile into a crowd of pedestrians before it rolled over after crashing with a Mossos d'Esquadra police car conducting a checkpoint at the intersection of Passeig Miramar, Passeig Marítim, and Rambla de Jaume I streets. The crash left one police officer injured. The five individuals inside were wearing fake suicide vests and attacked bystanders with knives. They stabbed a 63-year-old Spanish woman to death and injured six other people in the attack.

A police officer shot and killed four of the assailants, while a fifth died of his injuries hours later. Bystanders filmed one of the assailants being shot by police as he ran towards them. The men were linked to the Barcelona attack according to the police.

==== Subirats ====
On 21 August, in the municipality of Subirats, police shot and killed Younes Abouyaaqoub in an area of vineyards near the train tracks. They were alerted by a neighbor of the town, who warned that there was a stranger in the town's vicinity who could be Abouyaaqoub.

== Casualties ==
Victims by nationality
Country	Dead			Injured		
Country	Alcanar	Barcelona	Cambrils	Alcanar	Barcelona	Cambrils
Spain	0	4	1	10	0	2
Argentina	0	2 (Note: including a dual Argentine-Spanish citizen and an Italian-born Argentine woman)	0	0	2	0
Italy	0	2	0	1	3	0
Portugal	0	2	0	0	0	0
Australia	0	1 (Note: A dual Australian-British child)	0	0	4	0
Canada	0	1	0	0	4	0
Belgium	0	1	0	0	2	0
United States	0	1	0	0	1	0
Germany	0	1	0	0	13	0
France	0	0	0	4	30	0
Cuba	0	0	0	0	5	0
Philippines	0	0	0	0	4	0
Algeria	0	0	0	0	3	0
Greece	0	0	0	0	3	0
Morocco	0	0	0	0	3	0
Netherlands	0	0	0	0	3	0
Romania	0	0	0	0	3	0
Republic of China	0	0	0	0	2	0
Denmark	0	0	0	0	2	0
Ecuador	0	0	0	0	2	0
Venezuela	0	0	0	0	2	0
Colombia	0	0	0	0	1	0
Macedonia	0	0	0	0	1	0
Honduras	0	0	0	0	1	0
Ireland	0	0	0	0	1	0
Japan	0	0	0	0	1	0
Peru	0	0	0	0	1	0
Russia	0	0	0	0	0	1
Serbia	0	0	0	0	1	0
Turkey	0	0	0	0	1	0
Dominican Republic	0	0	0	0	1	0
Hungary	0	0	0	0	1	0
Egypt	0	0	0	0	1	0
Brazil	0	0	0	0	1	0
Austria	0	0	0	0	?	?
Kuwait	0	0	0	0	?	?
United Kingdom	0	0	0	0	?	?
Mauritania	0	0	0	0	?	?
Pakistan	0	0	0	0	?	?
Unknown	0	0	0	0	28	4
Total	0	15	1	15	133	6
Total	16			155		

Aside from eight attackers, 16 people of nine nationalities were killed: 14 who were struck by the van in La Rambla, including one who died from injuries ten days after the attack, one stabbed in Barcelona by the La Rambla attacker when the attacker stole his car, and one who was struck by the car in Cambrils. Eleven of the victims were foreign nationals, ten of them tourists. More than 130 people from over 34 nations were injured, many critically.

== Suspects ==
The imam Abdelbaki Es Satty died in the Alcanar gas explosion on 16 August, as did Youssef Aalla, brother of Said Aallaa. Five suspected members were shot dead by police on 18 August after the Cambrils attack: Moussa Oukabir, Omar Hychami, El Houssaine Abouyaaqoub, Said Aallaa and Mohamed Hychami. Younes Abouyaaqoub, the man believed to have been the van driver, was killed by police on 21 August. Four additional suspects were detained by police.

=== Younes Abouyaaqoub ===
Catalan president Carles Puigdemont confirms the Mossos d'Esquadra have shot and killed the driver of the Barcelona attack, Younes Abouyaaqoub, on August 21

Younes Abouyaaqoub, aged 22, was born on 1 January 1995 in M'rirt, Morocco, and had lived in Ripoll, Spain, since he was four years old. He was the driver of the van that killed 13 people on La Rambla. He initially fled the scene of the attack on La Rambla through the Mercat de la Boqueria, then hijacked a car near the Zona Universitària station, stabbing the driver, Pau Pérez, to death. On 21 August, police caught up with him in Subirats, a village near Barcelona. He was wearing a fake suicide vest and shouted "Allahu Akbar" before police shot and killed him.

According to police sources, his identity documents were found in the second van, which was intercepted by Catalan police in Vic. His mother told the press that her son had been brainwashed by the imam Abdelbaki Es Satty.

=== Houssaine Abouyaaqoub ===
Houssaine Abouyaaqoub, aged 19, was the brother of Younes Abouyaaqoub and one of the attackers killed in Cambrils in the early hours of 18 August. He was a deliveryman for a kebab restaurant in Ripoll. Both Abouyaaqoub brothers were first cousins of Mohamed and Omar Hychami.

=== Moussa Oukabir ===
Moussa Oukabir was 17 at the time of the attack. He was shot and killed by police after the Cambrils attack.

The Fiat Talento van used in the La Rambla attack had been rented using the ID of Oukabir's brother who told police that Moussa Oukabir had stolen his ID.

Moussa Oukabir had been living legally in Spain since 2005. In 2014 and 2015, he played futsal (a form of indoor football) for the local Ripoll youth team. In 2015, when asked on the social media website Kiwi what he would do in his first day as king of the world, he responded, "Kill the infidels and only spare Muslims who follow the religion." Moussa's brother has told the judge that Moussa had increased his prayer frequency, chided him for not spending time with Muslims only, and had told him that Muslims have to do "jihad, which implies war".

=== Said Aallaa ===
Said Aallaa, 19, was born in Naour, Morocco. He had been living in Ribes de Freser, Spain, a village near Ripoll.

He was shot and killed by police after the Cambrils attack. La Vanguardia reported that Aallaa's social media contained photographs of firearms and that his religiosity was evidenced by his membership in Islamic study groups. Said had left a note in his room apologising for the harm he was about to cause.

=== Youssef Aallaa ===
Aalla's death in the explosion at Alcanar was later confirmed by police from DNA at the explosion site. Like all the other suspects, Youssef was born in Morocco. Youssef was a brother of Said Aallaa. Their father said Youssef attended the mosque.

=== Mohamed Hychami ===
Mohamed Hychami, aged 24 was born in Mrirt, Morocco. He was the cousin of Younes Abouyaaqoub, the driver of the van in the La Rambla attack. He was in the Audi used in the Cambrils attack and was shot and killed by police there. Hychami's mother told the media that Mohamed had said he was leaving on vacation and would return in a week.

=== Omar Hychami ===
Omar Hychami was 21, and was born in Mrirt, Morocco. He was the brother of fellow attacker Mohamed Hychami, and the cousin of the Rambla van driver Younes Abouyaaqoub. He worked for an agricultural construction sector.

=== Abdelbaki Es Satty ===
Abdelbaki Es Satty was a 44-year-old imam in Ripoll who was born in Morocco in 1973 and arrived in Spain in 2002. He was convicted of drug smuggling in 2014 and was to be deported from Spain, but Es Satty claimed deportation violated his human rights and he remained in Spain. A successful asylum application in November 2014 facilitated him moving freely in the 26 EU countries of the Schengen area. On 21 August, he was confirmed to have died in the accidental explosion in Alcanar on 16 August. As the imam thought to have been important in radicalising the other terrorists, he has been considered the "mastermind" of the planned attacks.

Es Satty had been renting a room in the house for four months. Es Satty, who had been employed as imam at the Ripoll mosque since 2015, quit "abruptly" in June. He had also stayed in Belgium for approximately three months in 2016, where he had been searching for work, including in Vilvoorde. Investigators believe the imam might be aligned with the Salafist movement, but this might not be unusual, as one in three Islamic prayer centers in Catalonia is.

He has been described as "unfailingly courteous and studiously discreet", betraying no radicalism in his appearance and interactions with those who did not know him, and training those in his terrorist cell to also lead double lives.

=== Arrests ===
The Mossos d'Esquadra arrested four men in connection with the attacks. Three of the men were arrested in Ripoll: the owner of the car used in the Cambrils attack, the brother of Moussa Oukabir, and a third man. In Alcanar, 20-year-old Mohamed Houli Chemlal, who survived the Alcanar explosion, was also arrested. Mohamed Houli Chemlal and Driss Oukabir have been charged with membership of a terror organisation and murder, with Mohamed also being charged with possession of explosives. Both were found to be guilty by the Audiencia Nacional in 2021, although being acquitted of terrorist homicide charges. By 24 August 2017, two of the suspects, Salh El Karib and Mohamed Aalla, had been released on certain conditions, including that they hand over their passports.

During the February 2025 trial, Mohamed Houli accused CNI of letting Abdelbaki Es Satty form the cell.

== ISIL inspiration ==
The ISIL-linked Amaq News Agency claimed the attack was carried out in response to the call for targeting states in the anti-ISIL coalition, of which Spain is a member, contributing about 400 soldiers training Iraqi Armed Forces and Iraqi Police forces.

The Economist portrayed the motivation for this 2017 attack in Spain as rather 'less obvious', Spain being 'a minor player in the campaign against ISIS and other groups', though admittedly Spain contributed 150 soldiers to Operation Serval fighting Islamic militants in Mali, and in online propaganda linked to ISIL the Sagrada Família basilica was suggested as a possible target and ISIL was suggested to have boasted about recovering the Islamic lands of Al-Andalus.

== Reactions ==
=== Domestic ===
Police and medical deployment at Plaça Catalunya, Barcelona, the day of the attack

Around 18:00 on the 17th, 1 hour after the attack, Mossos d'Esquadra (police force of Catalonia), activated operation 'Cronos', after confirming the perpetrators had fled the attack site. The operation mobilized all police officers implementing mandatory 12-hour shifts, established police checkpoints at all exit routes of Barcelona, borders and strategic points over Catalonia (also known as operation Cage), established permanent police presence at critical points, activated all specialized units of the force and centralized police command.

All public events in Barcelona were cancelled, and both Carles Puigdemont, the President of the Generalitat of Catalonia, and Ada Colau, the Mayor of Barcelona, cancelled their holidays to return to the city and take part in crisis management. Likewise, Prime Minister of Spain Mariano Rajoy cancelled his holidays and travelled to Barcelona with the Spanish Deputy Prime Minister, Soraya Sáenz de Santamaría, and Juan Ignacio Zoido, the Spanish Minister of the Interior. Spain declared three days of mourning.

The day after the attacks, a minute's silence led by King Felipe VI, Catalan president Carles Puigdemont, and Barcelona mayor Ada Colau was observed at Plaça de Catalunya, which ended with applause and chants of "No tinc por" ("I am not afraid"). During the following days candles and flowers were left at the Joan Miró mosaic at La Rambla, in memory of the victims. The King and Queen also left a wreath in the name of the Crown.

Political authorities in front of the "No tinc por" ("I am not afraid") demonstration on 26 August, 2017

On 26 August 2017, a large crowd marched down the Passeig de Gràcia in Barcelona in a protest against the terror attacks. The march was called by the city council and Catalan government. Some people booed the King of Spain and displayed signs blaming the Head of State for the Spanish arms sales. Other demonstrators displayed Spanish and Catalan flags.

On 10 September 2017, police and emergency services were awarded the Medal of Honour of the Parliament of Catalonia (Medalla d'Honor del Parlament de Catalunya). With this medal the Catalan Parliament recognises the dedication, effort, and courage of the Mossos d'Esquadra, Guàrdia Urbana de Barcelona, Cambrils Local Police, and the Medical Emergencies Service. The Major of the Catalan Police, Josep Lluís Trapero Álvarez, collected the award and made a speech mourning the victims.

=== International ===
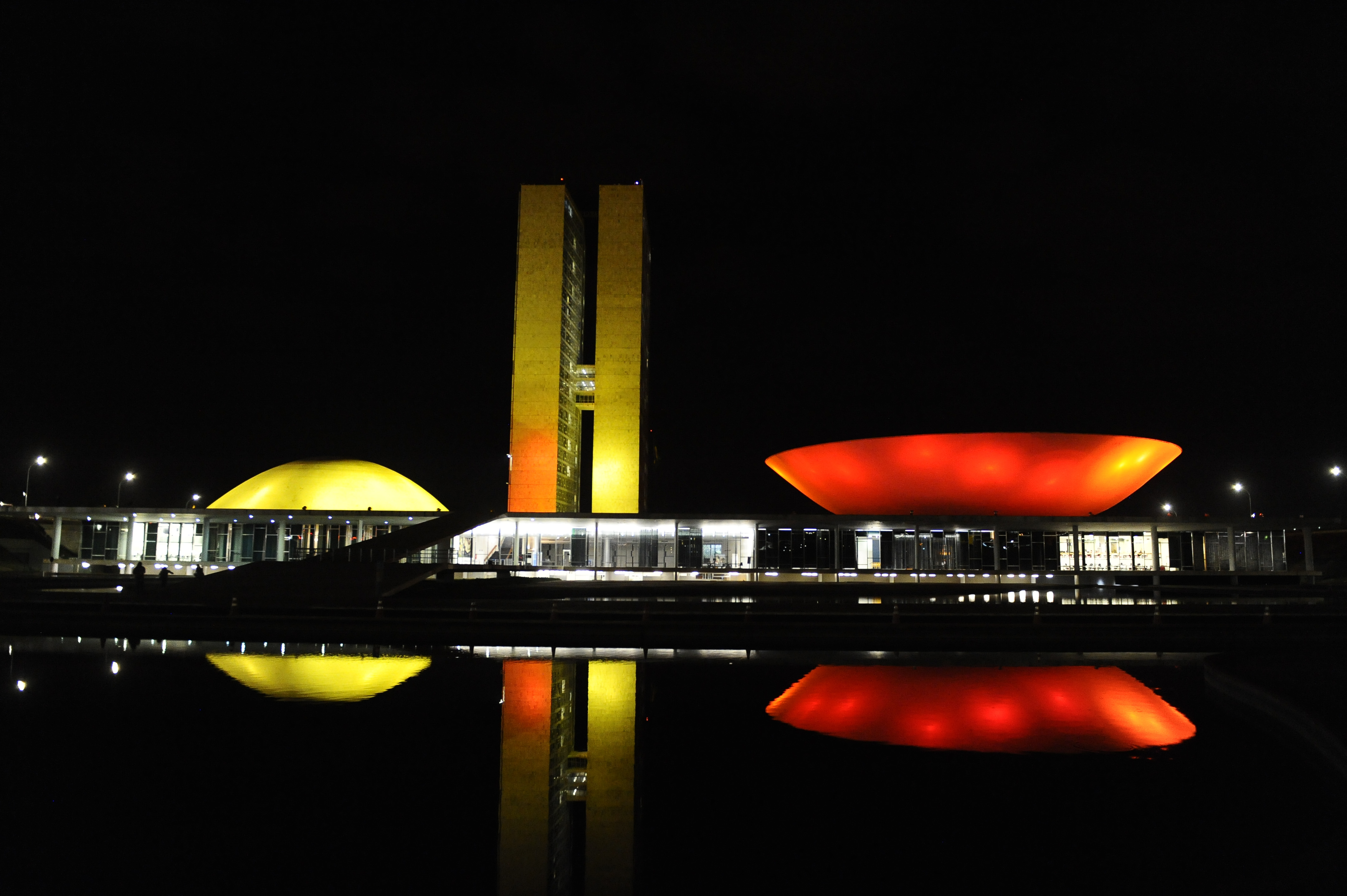
The Brazilian National Congress building was illuminated in the Spanish flag to show solidarity

Many world leaders reacted to the events, condemning the attacks and expressing shock and solidarity with Spain, as well as offering support. International leaders who expressed condolences and support included Emmanuel Macron (France), Theresa May (United Kingdom), Angela Merkel (Germany), Donald Trump, Barack Obama and Bill Clinton (United States), Xi Jinping (China), Jean-Claude Juncker (European Commission), Donald Tusk (European Council), Vladimir Putin (Russia) and Pope Francis (Vatican), among others.

News sources asked whether the attack would affect the vote in the 2017 Catalan independence referendum, taking place 2 months after the attacks.

== Aftermath ==
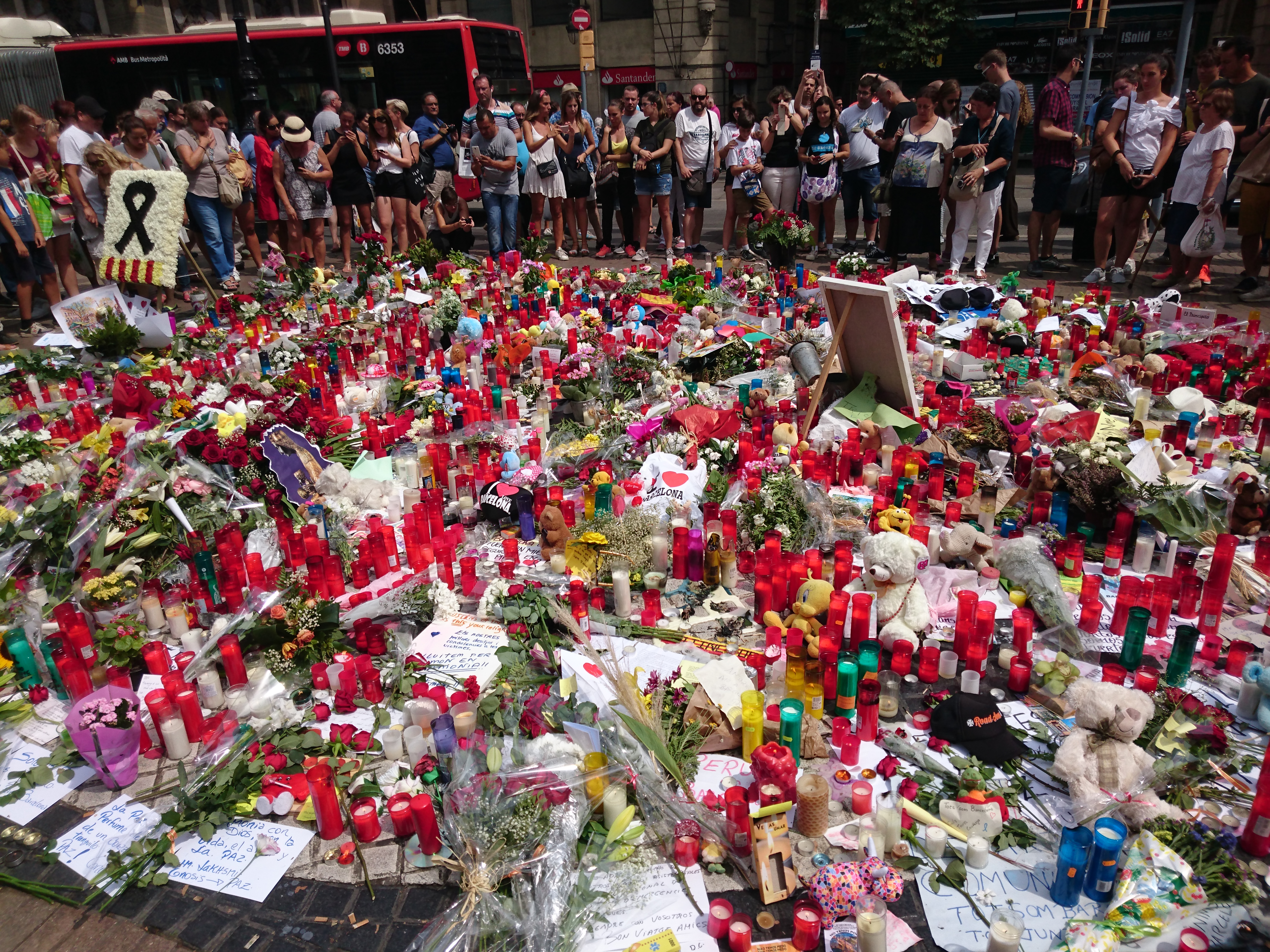
"Paviment Miró", where the van was stopped, covered in flowers the days after the attack

Several days after the attack, islamophobic incidents occurred in Sevilla, Logroño and Granada.

The Interior Ministry and the Cuerpo Nacional de Policía recommended the installation of bollards, but the Generalitat chose to increase the presence of police officers instead.

=== Threat to Spain and Gibraltar ===
On the night of 23 August 2017, the Islamic State of Iraq and the Levant uploaded a video praising the perpetrators of the attack and warning of more violence if the military actions against them in Syria and Iraq did not end, and threatening Gibraltar with an atomic bomb. The language used was accented Spanish. They also threatened to recreate al-Andalus as a caliphate and take revenge for the Muslims who died at the hands of the Spanish Inquisition.

The first author of the video was identified as Abu Lais Al Qurtubí (el Cordobés in Spanish) or Abu Laiz al Qurtubi, named Muhammad Yasin Ahram Pérez (1995-2019), Tomasa Pérez's oldest son, who converted to Islam after her marriage to the Moroccan Abdelah Ahram. He said "If you can’t make the hegira (journey) to the Islamic State, carry out jihad where you are; jihad doesn’t have borders. Allah willing, Al Andalus will become again what it was, part of the caliphate. Spanish Christians, don’t forget the Muslim blood spilt during the Spanish inquisition. We will take revenge for your massacre, the one you are carrying out now against Islamic State". The hooded author has been identified as Abu Salman Al-Andalus or Abu Salman al-Andalusí (el andaluz). Ahram stated: "We hope that Allah accepts the sacrifice of our brothers in Barcelona. Our war with you will continue until the world ends."

The threatening video to Gibraltar was published by Abu Albara Bin Malik and spread by Al Wafa. The threatening video was produced in Wilayat Jair, Deir Ezzor, Syria. According to Sahrawi journalist Bachir Mohamed Lahsen, terrorists only publish threats for propagandistic use and they should not be taken seriously.

As a response, Twitter users created an Internet meme based on the message by Ahram, mocking him as el hijo de la Tomasa, ("the Tomasa woman's son").

=== Verdict ===
In May 2021, the National Audience court sentenced three members of the jihadist organization which committed the attacks in 2017. Two of the accused, Mohamed Houli Chemlal and Driss Oukabir, were sentenced to an upwards of 53 and 46 years in prison respectively, the third, Said Ben Iazza, to 8 years in prison for the crime of collaboration. They were also banned from approaching the town of Alcanar, where they prepared the attacks.

=== 2022 statements by José Manuel Villarejo ===
In January 2022, former police commissioner José Manuel Villarejo, appeared to suggest that the Spanish authorities knew of Younes Abouyaaquob's plans ahead of time and used it to hamstring the Catalonian Independence movement, prompting Catalan president Pere Aragonès to call for an investigation. Many have dismissed the allegations as a conspiracy theory.

== In popular media ==
In 2020, Catalan journalist Anna Teixidor published a book about the attacks titled Sense por de morir: Els silencis del 17-A. The book was published in Spanish and Catalan.

A three-part docuseries 800 Meters about the attacks and the police investigation was released on Netflix on 25 March 2022, and it was directed by Elías León. On 4 September 2026 it will be released the drama thriller film Cronos, directed by Fernando González Molina and starring Enric Auquer, Mónica López and Diana Gómez, which is about the investigations following the attack.

== See also ==
- 2017 in Spain
- List of terrorist incidents in August 2017
- Timeline of Barcelona
- 1987 Hipercor bombing
- 2008 Barcelona terror plot
- Muslim rule of Barcelona
