= Susan Ejore =

Kenyan runner

Susan Ejore-Sanders
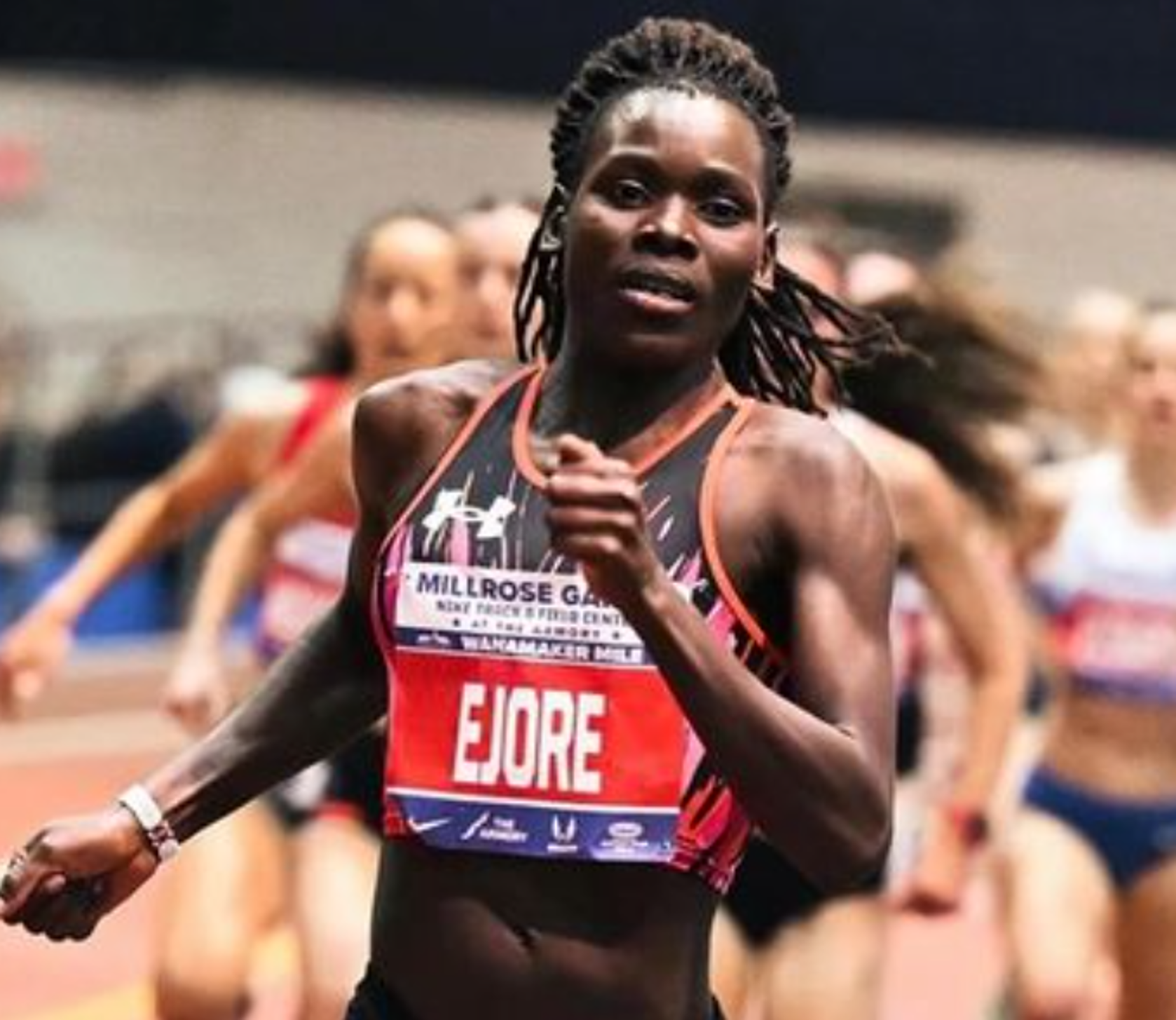

Personal information
- Nationality: Kenyan
- Born: November 9, 1995 (age 31) Nakuru, Kenya
- Employer: Under Armour
- Height: 5 ft 0 in (152 cm)

Sport
- Sport: middle-distance running long-distance running
- Events: 800 Meters, 1500 Metres, 3000 metres, 5000 metres
- College team: University of Oregon Ducks; Monroe College
- Club: Under Armour Flagstaff, Arizona
- Turned pro: 2020
- Coached by: Stephen Haas

Achievements and titles
- Personal bests: 800 Meters: 1:59.51, 1500 Metres: 4:02.20, Mile: 4:20.61NR, 3000 metres: 8:55.25, 5000 metres: 15:18.58

Susan Ejore-Sanders (nee Ejore born November 9, 1995) is a professional long-distance runner.

== High School ==
Susan Lokayo Ejore started running at St. Gabriel's Mission School in Nakuru, Kenya, where she completed in cross country and track and field.

== College ==
Ejore graduated from the University of Oregon and Monroe College.

In 2016, her first track season at Monroe College, Ejore won the mile and 1,000 m at the NJCCA Indoor Championships. She also ran on the winning distance medley relay team. She went on to win the 1,500 m at the NJCAA Championships, place second in the 800 m, and run on the winning 4 × 800 m relay team The next year, she repeated her 1,500 m and 4 × 800 m victories and added 800 m gold to her tally.

== Professional ==
Ejore-Sanders is sponsored by Under Armour and is a member of Under Armor Dark Sky Distance. On February 11, 2024, Susan Ejori-Sanders set a Kenya National Record in the indoor mile (4:20.61). Her successful year continued at the Olympic Games, where she placed sixth the 1500 m in a personal best time of 3:56.07. That year, Ejore-Sanders also ran a personal best of 1:57.12 in the 800 m.

== Statistics ==
Grand Slam Track results
Slam	Race group	Event	Pl.	Time	Prize money
2025 Kingston Slam	Short distance	800 m	5th	1:59.26	US$30,000
2025 Kingston Slam	Short distance	1500 m	2nd	4:05.10	US$30,000
