= Barcelona tram strike =

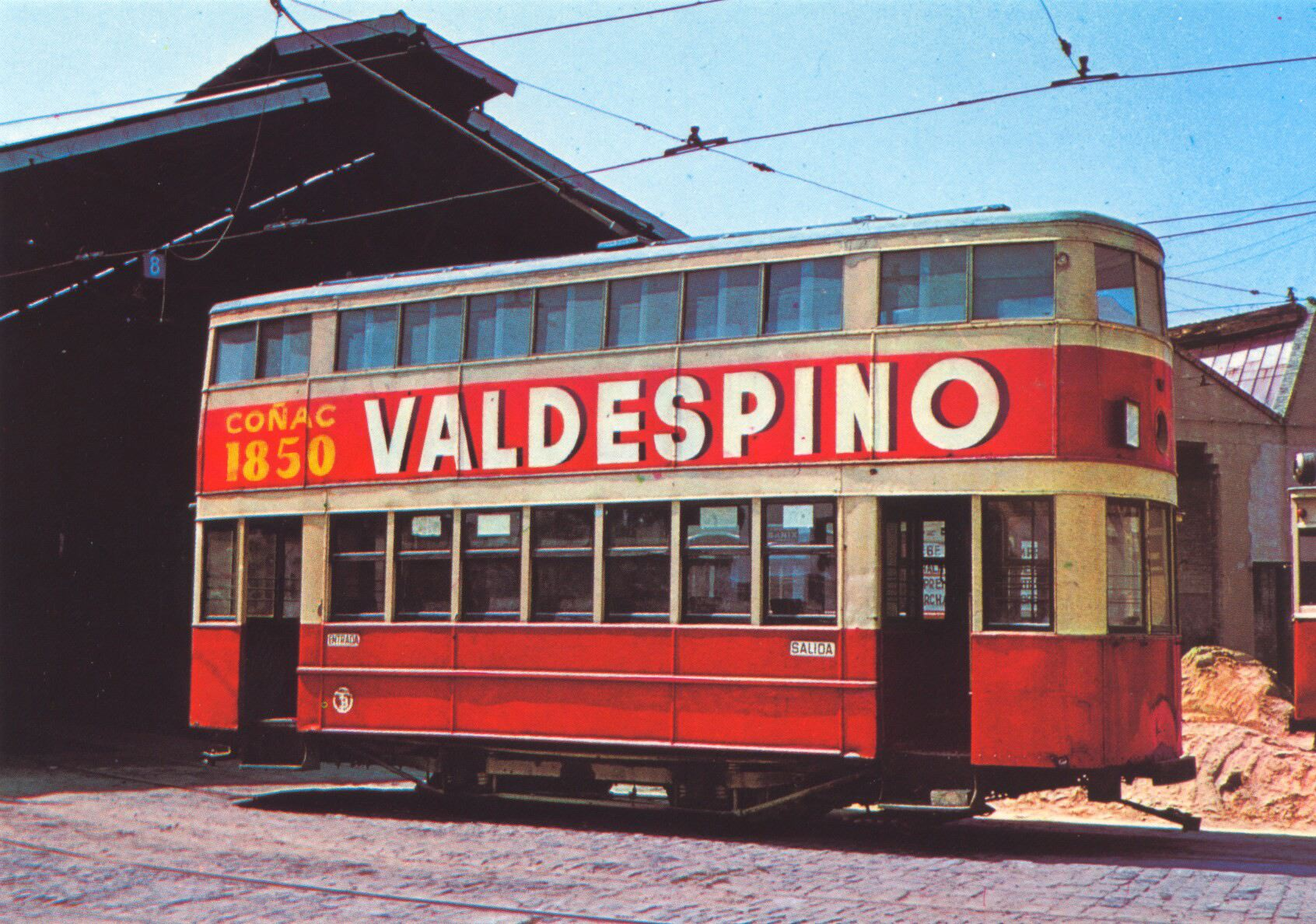
Tram in Barcelona in the 1950s.

The Barcelona tram strike was a strike in Barcelona, Catalonia, Spain, that took place on March 1, 1951. During the strike, citizens boycotted the Barcelona tram service, protesting a plan by local authorities to increase tram fares by up to 40%. Although the strike did not achieve all of its goals, it was successful in having the fare increase withdrawn. It was considered "the last battle of the generation that lost the war."

== Historical importance ==
Francoist Spain prohibited the organization of strikes. The Spanish dictator, Francisco Franco, considered strikes an unchanging part of the "law of the jungle in primitive societies." The Barcelona tram strike was the first strike organized since the Spanish Civil War, and it also represented one of the first large scale demonstrations against the Francoist regime.

In Barcelona, slogans began to circulate urging people to refrain from tram usage, such as:

"Be a good citizen, show your courage. Starting March 1, hoof it to work."
"If you want your morning jolly, stay away from the trolley."

The cause was a proposed hike in ticket prices, which was perceived as unfair in comparison with prices in Madrid. Additionally, there was a feeling of deep malaise among the population due to the harsh living conditions in Catalonia since the end of the Civil War. The strike had political repercussions, particularly abroad.

== Content and support ==
For two weeks, citizens refused to use public transport, making their journeys on foot and participating in numerous protest demonstrations. Some protesters resorted to violence, and one tram was set on fire. Although some authors consider the strike a spontaneous movement, others indicate that it was a result of the leftist tradition of the city, given the fact that it was later supported by militants of the CNT, FNC, FNEC and others; even the leader of the PSUC Gregorio López Raimundo was arrested.

...When the day of the boycott arrived, on March 1, trams ran empty through the streets of the city while minor incidents took place in the markets – about three hundred people, including numerous Falangists, went down the central Via Laietana shouting: "Long live Franco!" and "Death to the Governor!" He ordered the rapid concentration of Falangists while asking that the Syndicate remain discreet, stating that the working class had remained calm and it was better not to touch it...

The civil governor, Eduardo Baeza Alegría, knew that many Falangists had been acting in concert with the protestors, to the point of using their vehicles to transport pedestrians who supported the boycott. Faced with this insubordination, he attempted to set the Party against the population, but the Falangists refused to obey, on days three, four, and five, the dictates of their theoretical Provincial Chief.

== Consequences ==
The governor used the Civil Guard in clashes that resulted in deaths on March 12. Finally, both he and the Mayor of Barcelona, José María de Albert Despujol, were dismissed and the price hike was revoked. The conflict extended to Madrid on 2 April, but the "National Day of Protest" organized for 20 May was a failure.

The Government of Spain decided to act moderately in repressing the strikes. It attributed them publicly to the actions of Communist elements, who, having failed in their armed struggle, had changed their tactics, trying to use the existing discontent of the working class in their favour.

== See also ==
- History of Barcelona
- Timeline of Barcelona
- Barcelona General Strike of 1951
- La Canadiense strike – Historical general strike in Catalonia
