= Abdelbaki Es Satty =

Moroccan imam who planned the 2017 Barcelona attacks

- Born: 1973; Morocco
- Died: 16 August 2017 (aged 44); Alcanar, Spain
- Cause of death: Accidental death from explosion
- Known for: Planning the 2017 Barcelona attacks

Abdelbaki Es Satty (Arabic: عبدالباقي إس ستي; 1973 – 16 August 2017) was a Moroccan imam in Ripoll, Spain. On 21 August, he was confirmed to have died in an accidental explosion in Alcanar on 16 August, which began the 2017 Barcelona attacks. Satty is believed to have been the mastermind of the planned attacks and to have radicalised the twelve terrorists responsible into the Takfir wal-Hijra sect, which allows adherents to copy typically "Western" behaviour often forbidden in Islam in order to conceal their radicalisation and terror plans. However, he was also serving as an informant to Spain's intelligence agency, CNI.

== Previous terrorist and criminal activities ==
Es Satty was implicated in the 2006 Operation Chacal, in which five Islamists were arrested for sending jihadis to fight in Iraq. From 2003 he had shared an apartment with Islamists connected to the Moroccan Islamic Combatant Group (GICM) and the 2003 Casablanca bombings.

In 2012, the imam completed a four-year prison sentence for drug trafficking in Castellón. While in prison, he is reported to have established a "special friendship" with Rachid Aglif, who was serving an 18-year sentence for his role in the 2004 Madrid train bombings.

He was convicted of drug smuggling in 2014 and was to be deported from Spain, but Es Satty claimed deportation violated his human rights and he remained in Spain. A successful asylum application in November 2014 facilitated him moving freely in the 26 EU countries of the Schengen area.

Es Satty, who had been employed as imam at the Ripoll mosque since 2015, quit "abruptly" in June. He had also stayed in Belgium for some three months in 2016, where he had been searching for work, including in Vilvoorde.

An official who works on de-radicalisation in Belgium said that Es Satty tried to secure a post at a mosque near Brussels but the elders decided he should not be allowed to preach due to his "radicalised and polarising" approach. Investigators believe the imam might be aligned with the Salafist movement, but this might not be unusual, as one in three Islamic prayer centers in Catalonia are.

He has been described as "unfailingly courteous and studiously discreet", betraying no radicalism in his appearance and interactions with those who did not know him, and training those in his terrorist cell to also lead double lives.

== Barcelona attacks ==
Es Satty had been renting a room in the house in Alcanar for four months. On 16 August, he told his roommate that he was leaving for a trip to Morocco.

On 16 August 2017, the house was destroyed in an explosion. Satty and another man, Youssef Aallaa, died in the explosion.

Initially thinking it was an accidental gas explosion, police hours later discovered that the explosion was caused by stockpiled explosives accidentally going off. The explosive TATP and 120 canisters of butane and propane were found inside the house. There was speculation that the terrorists had intended to take trucks loaded with explosives and combustible gas to attack the Sagrada Família.
