= Josep Maria de Porcioles i Colomer =

Spanish politician (1904–1993)

Josep Maria de Porcioles

108th Mayor of Barcelona
- In office 15 March 1957 – 11 May 1973
- Preceded by: Antoni Maria Simarro i Puig
- Succeeded by: Enric Masó i Vázquez

Personal details
- Born: 15 September 1904 Amer
- Died: 3 September 1993 (aged 89) Vilassar de Dalt
- Party: FET y de las JONS
- Awards: Order of Isabella the Catholic; Royal Nobility Corps of the Principality of Gerona

Josep Maria de Porcioles i Colomer (Catalan pronunciation: [ʒuˈzɛb məˈɾi.ə ðə puɾsiˈɔləz]; Amer, 15 July 1904 – Vilassar de Dalt, 3 September 1993) was the mayor of Barcelona, Catalonia, Spain for sixteen years, from 15 March 1957 until 11 May 1973 during the fascist dictatorship of Francisco Franco. His long administration is associated with the rapid economic and industrial growth of the city during Spain's desarrolisme and unplanned urban sprawl in Barcelona to accommodate the hundreds of thousands of immigrants attracted to the city from southern Spain. He was finally forced to retire in 1973 due to neighbourhood protests over the poor quality of the housing in the new areas and lack of social provision, and the speculation and corruption associated with the mayor. He is interred in the Montjuïc Cemetery in Barcelona.

He was married to Dolores Sangenís Corrià, daughter of the Carlist politician Casimiro Sangenís Bertrán.

Preceded by Antoni M. Simarro i Puig	Mayor of Barcelona; 1957–1973	Succeeded by Enric Massó i Vázquez
