= Casimiro Sangenís Bertrán =

Spanish politician (1894–1936)

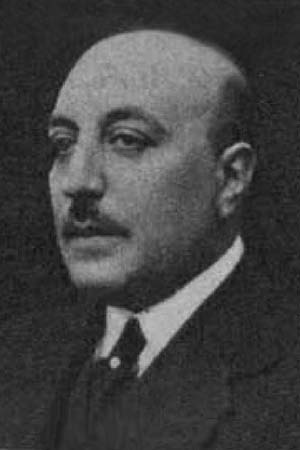
- Born: Casimiro Sangenís Bertrán; 1894; Lérida, Spain
- Died: 1936; Lérida, Spain
- Occupations: lawyer, landowner
- Known for: politician
- Political party: UP, Carlism

Casimiro Sangenís Bertrán (1894–1936) was a Spanish lawyer, landowner and politician from Catalonia. In the 1910s he sided with the Maurista branch of conservatism. In the 1920s he joined the Primoderiverista structures and was active in Unión Patriotica, serving also in Diputacion Provincial of Lérida in 1924–1929. In the 1930s he approached Traditionalism. His career climaxed in 1933–1936, when as a Carlist deputy he held a mandate to the Cortes. He was also active in provincial Lérida branches of various agricultural organisations and presided over the Lérida structures of Instituto Agricolá Catalan de San Isidro.

== Family and youth ==
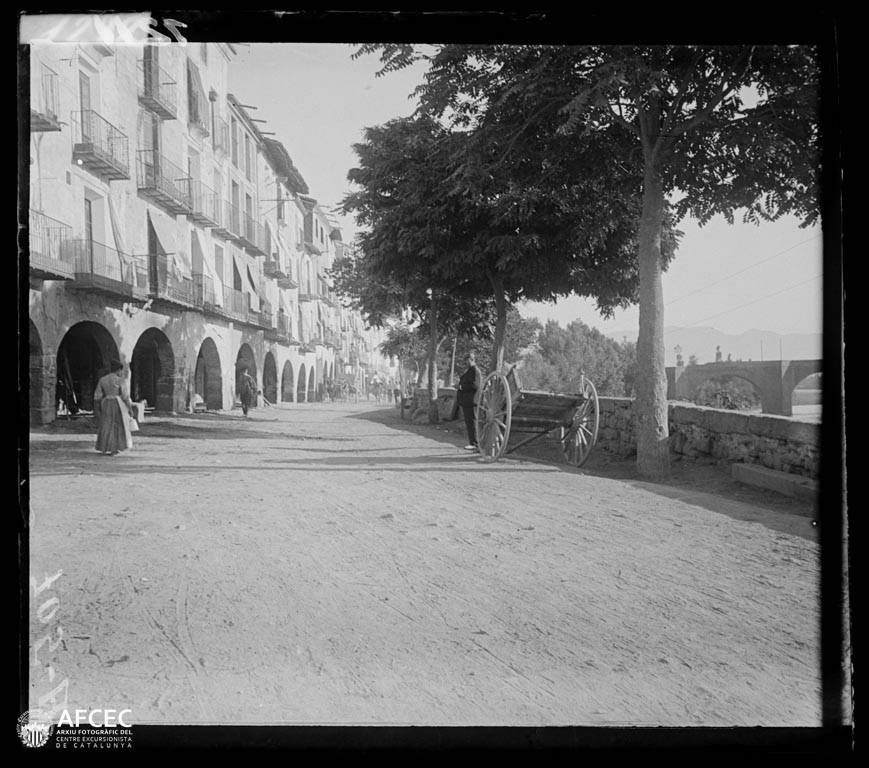
Balaguer, 1905

First knights bearing the name of Sant Genís were recorded in the Catalan city of Balaguer already in 1271, and since then they repeatedly keep appearing in municipal records; a patriotic lawyer Teodoro Sangenís from Balaguer was noted during the Napoleonic period. However, distant paternal ascendants of Casimiro are unknown. The only one identified was his father, Teodoro Sangenís Alós (1845-after 1932). In the mid-1870s he joined the medical corps of the army, as médico segundo served in Cuba, in the mid-1880s returned to the peninsula and in 1889 as médico mayor was posted to Lérida. Having retired in the 1890s, in 1899 he was recorded as metje i propietari. It is not clear whether he inherited or purchased landed property; in 1905 he was member of Junta Directiva of Cámara Agrícola of Lérida and in 1915 served as alcalde of Balaguer. His brothers also held mid-range administrative and juridical positions in the provinces of Lérida and Gerona.

In 1886 in Lérida Teodoro married Teresa Bertrán Viladot (died 1932); her father (and the maternal grandfather of Casimiro) was Casimiro Bertrán Barbé, vice-consul of France in Lérida; a lawyer but also a terratinient, he owned an estate crowned with "bonita torre" at the banks of the Segre. Teodoro and Teresa settled in Lérida; it is not clear how many children they had. There is neither anything known about the schooling years of the young Casimiro, which must have fallen on the early years of the 20th century; the only information available is that he studied law and graduated in the University of Barcelona prior to 1914. In the mid-1910s he was already registered in the local Colegio de Abogados, yet none of the sources consulted claims he has ever practiced as a lawyer. In the late 1910s he was noted rather as "conocido e ilustrado y rico propietario", as apparently he has taken over the family economy.

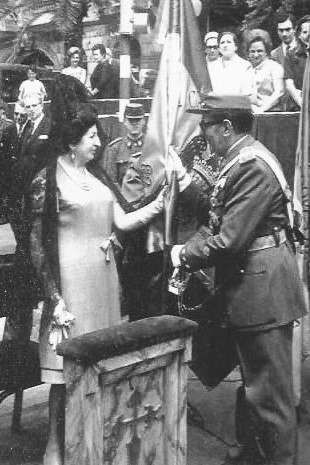
daughter, early 1970s

In 1917 Sangenís married Carmen Corrià Salvadó (in some sources Salvador), a girl from the nearby Artesa de Lleida (died 1981). She was daughter to Josep Corrià Melgoso, also a local landowner and an entrepreneur in the olive oil business. The couple lived in Lérida, managing their landed property scattered also in the province of Barcelona. They had two children, Juan Casimiro and Dolores Sangenís Corrià. Juan, initially a Carlist but later a Falangist, became a high regime official during late Francoism; he served in the Cortes, as alcalde of Lérida and as president of Diputación Provincial. Dolores also made it to high society, as she married José Ma de Porcioles i Colomer, the longtime mayor of Barcelona from the late 1950s till the early 1970s. Their son and the grandson of Casimiro, José María de Porcioles Sangenís, following a career in business and publishing when a retiree is currently recognized and active as an amateur historian of Barcelona.

== Dictatorship ==
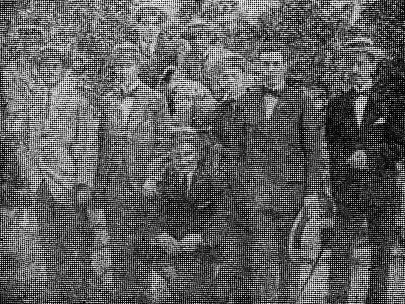
with colleagues (squatting), 1910s

It is not known what were political preferences of Casimiro's ancestors, though his paternal uncle was associated with Liberalism. Works on caciquismo in Lérida and on Catalan Carlism of the late 19th century do not mention his father, except a brief note on the Sangenis family - unclear whether related - among prestigious Traditionalists in Barcelona. He was first noted in the press himself in 1914, when co-signing a letter which congratulated the government on adopting the neutral position during the Great War. Sometime in the mid-1910s he neared the Conservatives, as in 1919 Sangenis was already referred to as the one "que ha figurado siempre en el partído monárquico conservador". Prior to general elections of this year he was initially rumored to stand on the conservative, anti-Lliga ticket to the Cortes from Lérida, but there is no follow-up known. At the turn of the decades and in the early 1920s if mentioned in newspapers, it was due to his membership in provincial agricultural organizations.

Following the Primo de Rivera coup in 1923 Sangenis engaged in institutions supporting the regime; in 1924 he entered Junta Directiva of Unión Patriótica in Borjas Blancas, and was its representative in Junta Provincial of UP. The same year he was appointed to Diputación Provincial of Lérida, where he represented the district of Lérida - Borjas Blancas. He threw himself into numerous activities: corresponded with Mancomunitat on devolution of powers, entered a commission dedicated to "obras públicas y comunicaciones" and as such supervised road construction works, and was member of Diputación-related charity bodies. In 1926 he became jefe de obras públicas, e.g. working on water supply in the comarca or (referred to in the press as "ingeniero jefe de Obras Públicas") on the road infrastructure. In the mid-1920s he entered Junta Provincial de Enseñanza Industrial and the provincial Cruz Roja. Sangenis a few times visited Minister of Labor in Madrid, yet details of these talks are unknown. In 1927 he represented Lérida in Asamblea de Diputaciones Españolas. In 1929 he rose to vice-president of the Diputación. He remained in Comité Provincial of Unión Patriótica.

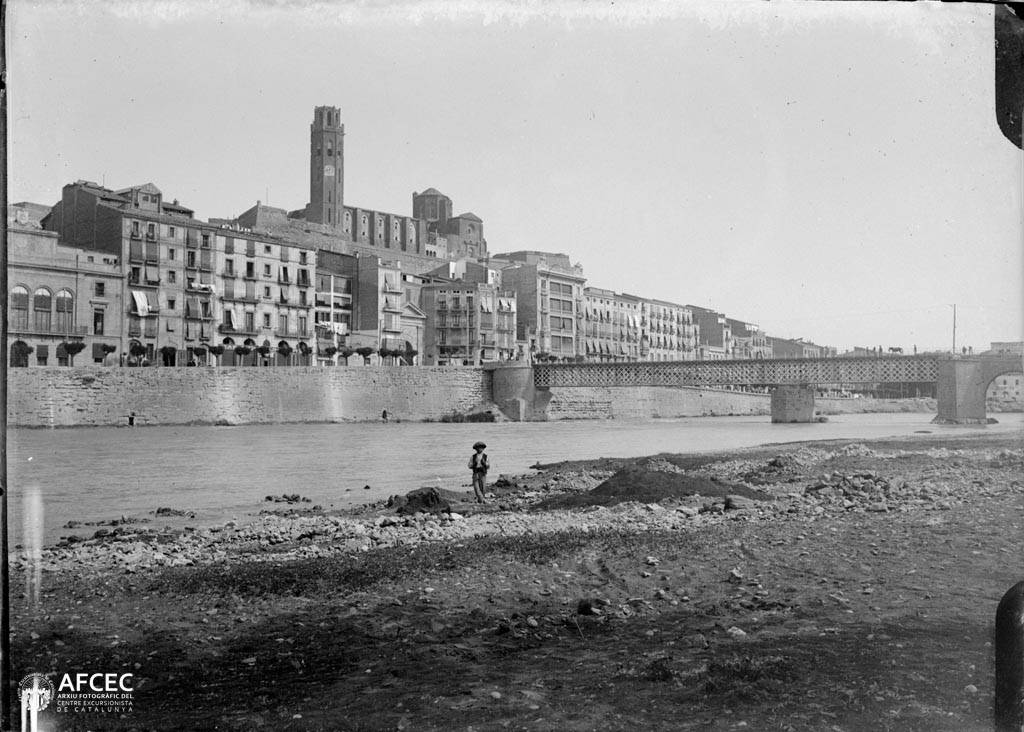
Lérida, 1920s

In the 1920s Sangenis emerged as a personality among the provincial landholders. Both in contemporary press and in present-day historiographic works he is noted as conocido y rico propietario and gran propietari rural, apart from estates near Balaguer and Lérida holding also possessions in the province of Barcelona. He entered the provincial executive of Instituto Agricolá Catalan de San Isidro, the Catalan organization grouping mostly landholders, and continued in this role for some years to come. It is not clear whether his taking part in numerous agricultural initiatives was related to his role in Diputación or in IACSI, as e.g. in 1927 he acted in Congreso Remolachero, becoming member of Unión de Remolacheros executive, and in 1928 he featured in Patronato del Concurso de Maquinaria Agrícola. In 1930 he was vice-president of the provincial Camara de la Propiedad Rústica.

== Republic ==
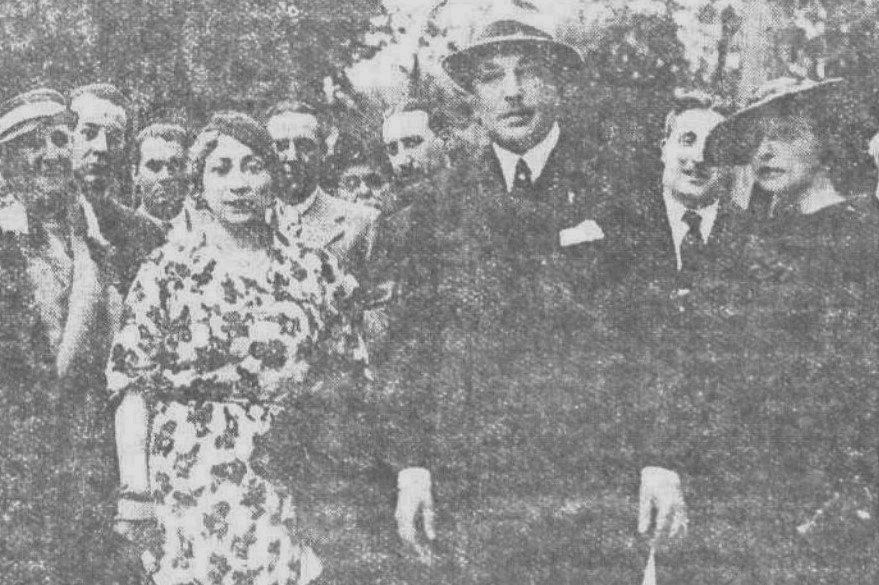
with Urraca Pastor in Lérida

Sangenis apparently believed in long-time perspectives of the Primo dictatorship, as in 1929 he penned an article on agrarian reform, to be carried out by the regime; one of its objectives was to be "solución de posibles antagonismos de clase". However, the same year he took part in a large conservative meeting in Barcelona, where Antonio Goicoechea advocated that activities of political parties be resumed. Nevertheless, there is no information available on Sangenis' allegiances during the dictablanda period; he ceased as member of Diputación Provincial in 1929. In the early 1930s he was merely listed officially as an abogado and suplente among Lérida members of Consejo General del Instituto Agricolá Catalan de San Isidro.

Following the fall of the monarchy and the advent of the Republic Sangenis approached Carlism. It is not clear what the mechanism of his political trajectory was, especially that in the 1920s he hosted in his house a homage session to Alfonso XIII. One scholar claims that he "ingreso en el carlismo en 1931" and his first confirmed presence in Traditionalist ranks is dated 1932, when Carlist structures in Catalonia were being re-organized; in June he was noted in presidium of the local council, supposed to work out the details; the provincial Carlist leader in Lérida at the time was Alfonso Piñol. In 1933 the provincial executive emerged as Consell Intercomarcal Tradicionalista de Lleida; apart from the president and his 3 deputies, Sangenis was one of its members. In late 1933 and as "propietario agrario y abogado" he entered also Consejo de Administración of Editorial Tradicionalista, the board supposed to supervise the party publishing house.

Carlist standard

It was in October 1933 that Sangenis was first mentioned in the press as clearly related to Carlism. During electoral campaign prior to the 1933 general elections he was to represent the party on a joint right-wing alliance list of Unió de Dretes. Though left-wing press stigmatized him as "home de la dictadura", the coalition emerged triumphant; Sangenis was its least-voted candidate, yet with 51,869 votes he was ensured a seat in the Cortes. Little is known of his activity in the chamber, where he joined the Carlist minority; he was noted rather as taking part in party rallies, mostly in Catalonia (e.g. at the Poblet sanctuary) though at times also beyond it (e.g.in Santander). During the 1934 crisis related to so-called Ley de Contratos de Cultivo he sided with landowners against the rabassaires, and travelled to Madrid when lobbying for the cause; at the time he was member of the provincial Jurado Mixto del Trabajo Rural, an arbitrary body set up by the Republic. Following the 1934 revolution he supported suspension of the Catalan autonomy statute. In terms of party strategy he clearly sided with the faction which advanced alliance with the Alfonsists, and together with Joaquín Bau was one of 2 Catalan Carlists who in December 1934 signed the founding act of Bloque Nacional.

== Last weeks ==
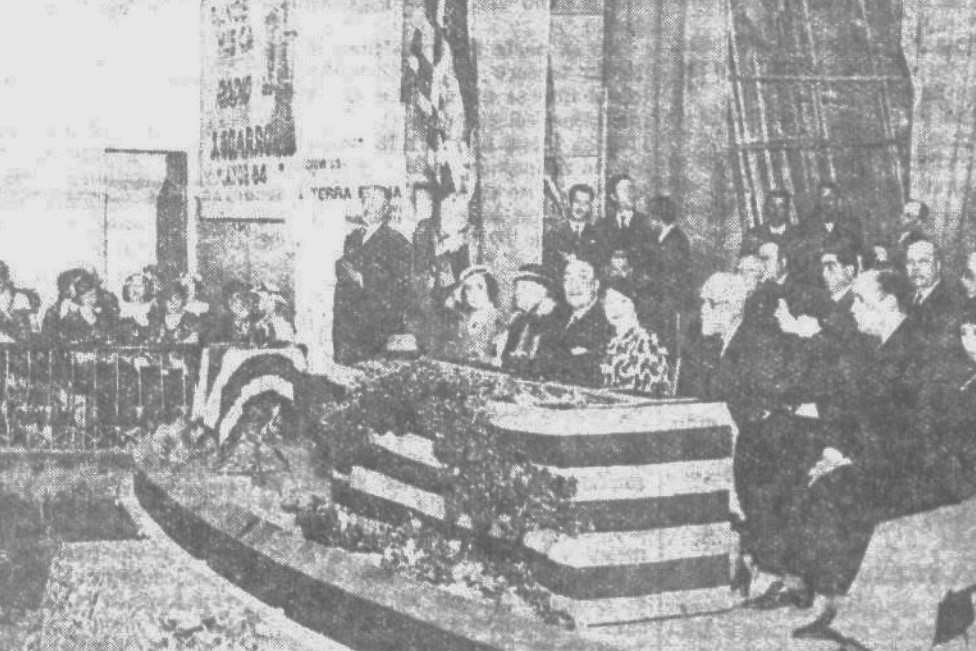
at Carlist rally, Lérida

When the Cortes term came to the end in late 1935, Sangenis tried to renew his ticket in the 1936 elections, again from Lérida. Right-wing parties managed to form an alliance, again titled Unió de Dretes. Unlike in most districts of the country it was not dominated by CEDA, as there was only 1 gilroblista candidate on the list; 2 were fielded by Lliga Regionalista, while Sangenis - who had to swallow his traditional enmity for Catalanism and appeared along the lligueros - was running on the Comunión Tradicionalista ticket. Though in the district of Lérida the triumph of Frente Popular was least decisive among all 5 Catalan districts, the right-wing-bloc was left defeated. Sangenis gathered more votes than in 1933, but 57,889 were not enough to guarantee the mandate, with the least-voted Frente Popular candidate gathering 69,701 votes. The defeat did not weaken his position in the party ranks. When in the spring of 1936 Catalan Carlism underwent another reshuffle, Sangenis remained in Junta Provincial (with Joan Lavaquial as jefe) and entered also the all-Catalan Junta Regional. Contemporary scholar counts him among leaders of Carlism in Lérida (with Joan Recasens, Lluis Besa Cantarell, Josep Condal Fontova, Miquel Baró Bonet, Josep Abizanda, and Josep Rovira Nebot), though not exactly in Catalonia.

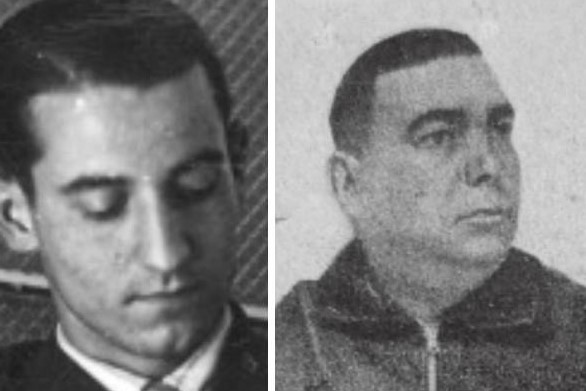
Pelegrí (left) and Larroca (right)

Sangenis spoke violently against the parliamentary democracy, yet it is not known whether and if yes to what extent he was involved in Carlist conspiracy against the Republic, initially designed as an exclusive Carlist project and then amalgamated into an alliance with the military. None of the sources consulted mentions him as taking part, though later the revolutionary tribunal claimed that he "ajudà amb diners al cop feixista", supported the Fascist coup with money. During the July rebellion he was in Lérida, where the rising failed. At unspecified time in late July or early August he was detained. On August 22 he was delivered for a trial by a newly established Tribunal Popular, which has just commenced its sittings. The tribunal was dominated by the radical left-wing militants; its president Francesc Pelegrí Garriga from POUM and the prosecutor José Larroca Vendrell from CNT were railway workers. Sangenis was charged not only with financing the coup, but also with pressing repressive legislation in the aftermath of the 1934 revolution. Following a very brief session, described by one historian as a "kangaroo trial", Sangenis was sentenced to death; reportedly this was the first death sentence passed by this tribunal. Half an hour later he was shot at the local cemetery. His property was immediately expropriated. Pelegrí and Larroca died on exile in France; one unnamed individual complicit in the killing of Sangenís, a FAI member, was later apprehended and executed by Francoist authorities.

== See also ==
- Carlism
- Traditionalism (Spain)
- Patriotic Union (Spain)
- Juan Casimiro de Sangenís Corrià

== Footnotes ==
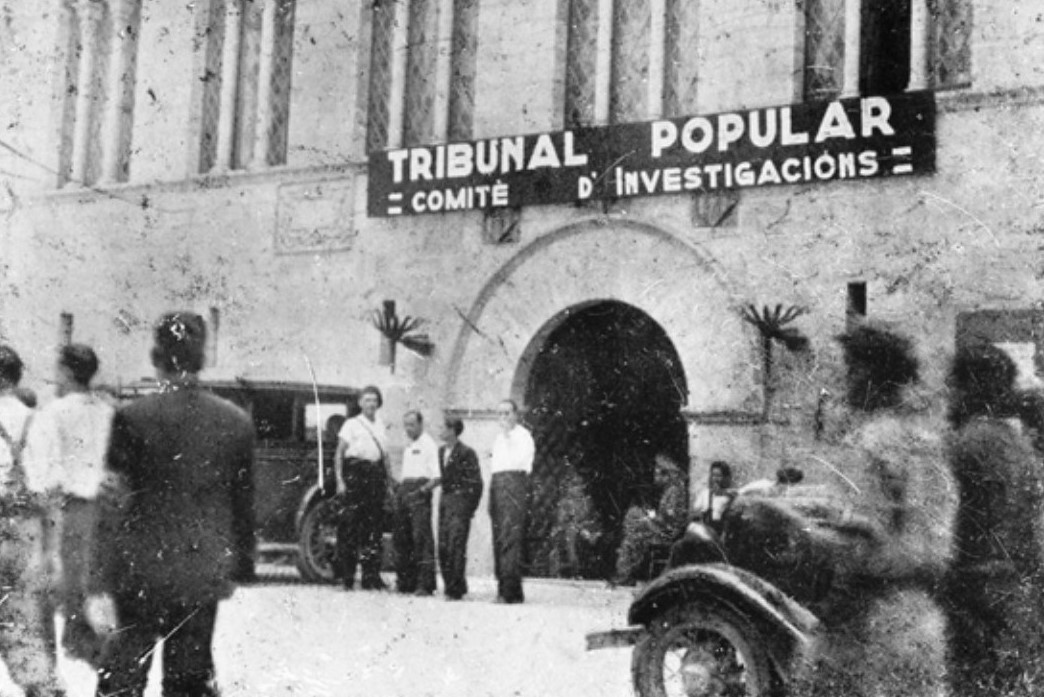
Lérida, site of Tribunal Popular
