= Barcelona International Centre of Photography =

Coordinates: 41°22′42″N 2°10′04″E

The Barcelona International Centre of Photography (El Centre Internacional de Fotografia Barcelona, in Catalan language, CIFB) was a singular initiative in the photographic culture of Spain in the second half of the 1970s, becoming a pioneering institution in the formation, study, exhibition, distribution and production of the photographic image.

The professional career of its initiator, Albert Guspi (1943-1985), an important innovator and central figure within the new photographic scene of the seventies, culminated in the creation of the CIFB. Despite its brief five-year existence, the CIFB became a reference in the reformation of photographic culture during the Spanish transition to democracy.

== History ==
In the heart of the Raval, at Carrer Aurora 11 bis, we can still find the building that once housed the Centre Internacional de Fotografia Barcelona, CIFB. On its façade, an icon of the renovation of the neighbourhood, we can still see the paintings by Arranz Bravo and Bartolozzi, restored in 1997.

The CIFB was a short-lived experiment in the process of institutionalisation of photographic culture during Spain's democratic Transition. The current study of this experiment, little known and almost forgotten despite its nearness in time and space, should be understood from a double perspective: local and global. On the one hand, this is a local study of a process that was taking place at an international level during the seventies: the re-composition of the cultural field within the new cultural industries following a post-industrial economic model. This was a moment of great expansion for the art market, with photography becoming part of it to an unprecedented degree. The seventies marked the beginning of a great international resurgence of institutions, festivals, academic programmes, galleries and publications that laid down the conditions for the interpenetration of culture and economy as it is known today. On the other hand, this is a study of how such generalised historical conditions took on a specific, local and very concrete form in the field of photography in Barcelona during the Transition. In this sense, the study sheds a different light on the period, allowing us to understand how disparate photographic practices and traditions, which have since become separate, were able to coexist at the time. The multiplicity of the seventies eventually lost ground when faced with a visualist conception of creative photography, whose hegemony began to establish itself after the Jornades Catalanes de Fotografia, which took place at the Fundació Joan Miró in 1980, and which, in retrospect, are still regarded as photography's official entry into the new cultural policies. The CIFB declined to take part in the Jornades.
