= Parc del Laberint d'Horta =

Park and maze in Barcelona, Spain

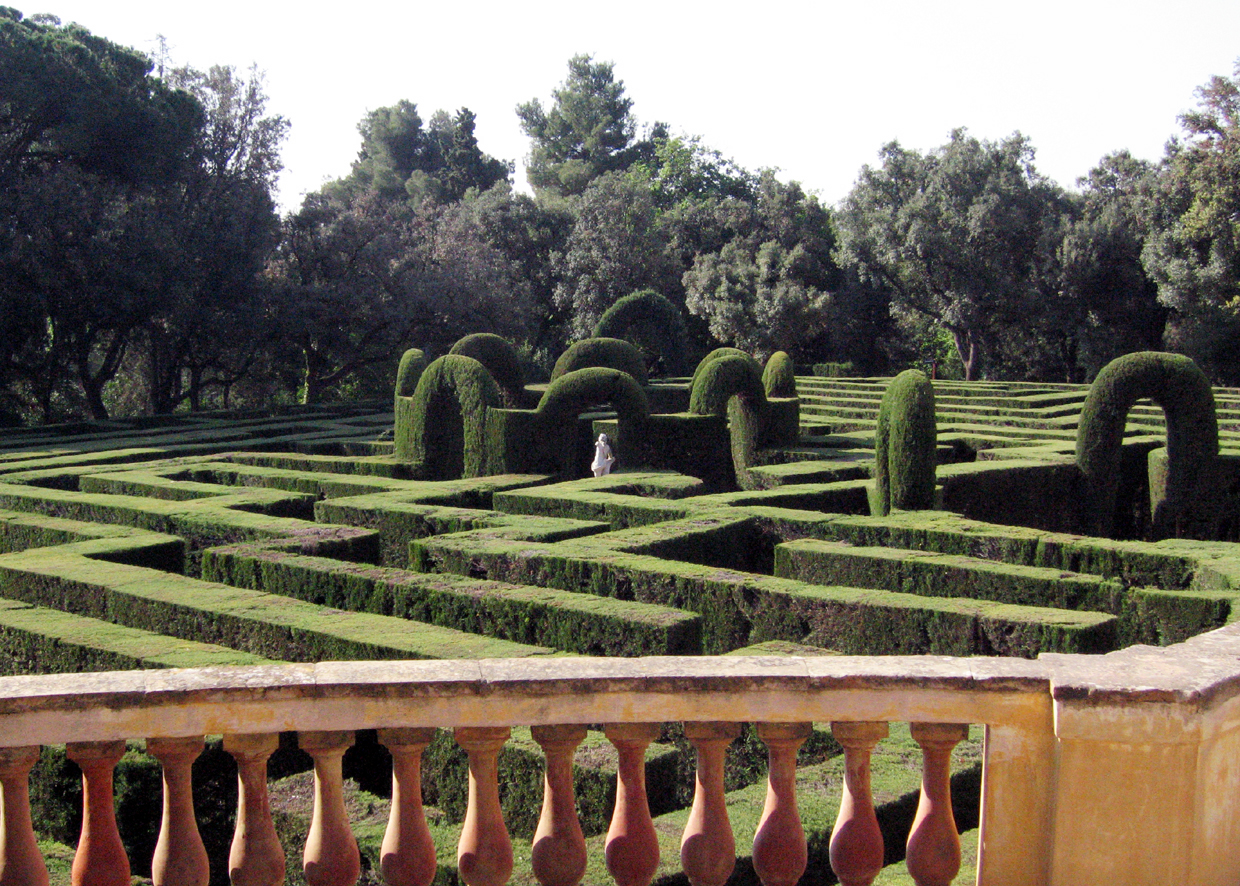
- Interactive map of Parc del Laberint d'Horta
- Type: Historical garden
- Location: Barcelona
- Coordinates: 41°26′25″N 2°8′44″E
- Created: 1791
- Status: Open all year

The Parc del Laberint d'Horta (Catalan pronunciation: [ˈpaɾɡ dəl ləβəˈɾin ˈdɔɾtə], "Park of the Labyrinth of Horta", sometimes referred to as Jardins (Gardens) del Laberint d'Horta) is a historical garden in the Horta-Guinardó district in Barcelona and the oldest of its kind in the city. Located on the former estate of the Desvalls family, next to the Collserola ridge, the park comprises an 18th-century neoclassical garden and a 19th-century romantic garden. On the lower terrace is the hedge maze that gives the park its name.

== History ==
Labyrinth - Parc del Laberint d’Horta

Works began in 1791 when marquis Joan Antoni Desvalls i d'Ardena, owner of the lot, created the design of a neoclassical garden in collaboration with Italian architect Domenico Bagutti. Execution was made under direction of master builders Jaume and Andreu Valls as well as French gardener Joseph Delvalet.

In mid-19th century, the descendants of the marquis hired architect Elies Rogent to expand the park. Rogent created then a romantic garden with flower beds, gazebos, huge trees and a waterfall. A water canal was also added to the garden, connecting the upper terrace and the intermediate one.

In 1880 a domestic garden was created beside the Desvalls palace.

At the end of the 19th century, the Desvalls estate became the venue of social and cultural events including open-air theatre performances.

In 1967 the Desvalls family handed over the park to the city of Barcelona, who opened to the public in 1971. Ample restoration works were carried out in 1994 with the financial support of the European Union.

The park is currently a garden-museum with a number of visitors limited to no more than 750 people at the same time, in order to preserve the delicate environment and structures of the area. The old Desvalls' Palace hosts, since 1993, Centre de Formació del Laberint (a city-owned institute of Gardening education) as well as a specialized library.

== Elements of the park ==
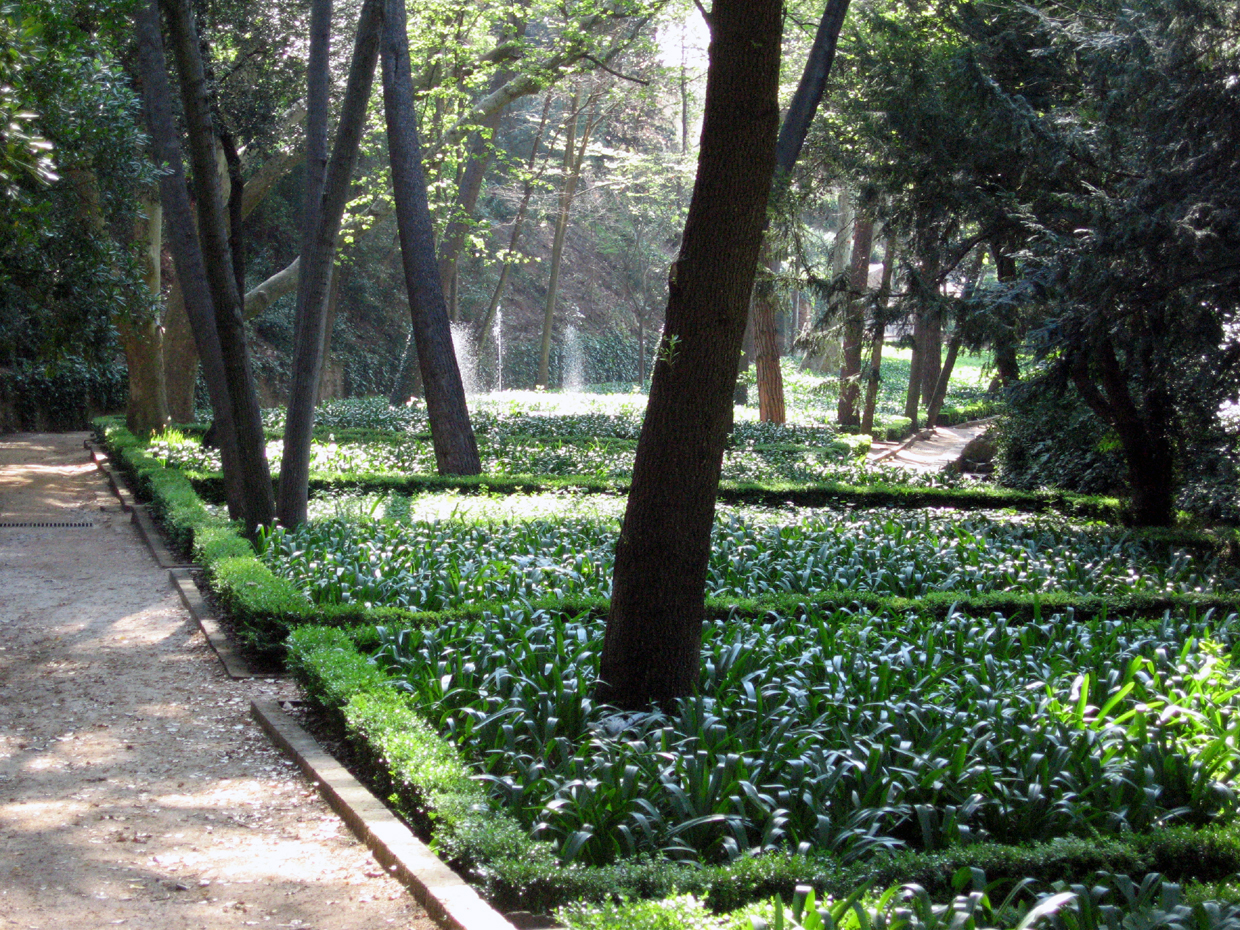
The Romantic Garden of the parc del Laberint d'Horta

Right next to the entrance of the park stands the former palace of the Desvalls family, a building with neoarabic and neogothic elements. The Torre Sobirana, an ancient medieval watchtower, is also part of this complex.

The park, which extends over a surface of 9.1 hectares, is divided into two parts: the neoclassical garden and the romantic garden. All around the park there are numerous sculptures, some depicting motives of Greek mythology and others with folk motives, as well as a number of fountains, springs, and pools.

The neoclassical garden comprises three terraces:

- On the lower terrace is the hedge maze that gives the park its name, made up of 750 metres of trimmed cypress trees. At the entrance of the labyrinth, there is a marble bas-relief depicting Ariadne and Theseus and in the centre, a statue of the god Eros.
- On the intermediate terrace, right over the maze, there are two Italian-style pavilions with Tuscan columns and statues of Danae and Ariadne, replicas of round Roman temples without cella. Next to the great staircase that leads to the third level, there is a bust of Dionysus, the god of wine and exuberance.
- On the third and uppermost terrace there is a pavilion dedicated to the nine muses, crowned by a sculpture depicting art and nature, on the foot of which can be read: Artis Naturaque Parit Concordia Pulchrum (Latin for "The harmony of art and nature generates beauty") and on the other side: Ars Concors Foetum Naturae Matris Alumbrat ("Harmonic art gives light onto the fruit of Mother Nature"). There is a big pond behind the pavilion with water coming from a natural source.

The romantic garden is distributed in a series of flower beds and small squares under the shade of huge trees. On the northernmost border of this side of the park, there's a waterfall. There aren't many traces left of the original design, but it seems that the romantic garden was built alluding to the theme of death - there even used to be a replica of a small graveyard, long gone - while the neoclassical garden revolves around the theme of love.

The park gardens are surrounded by a large area of Mediterranean forest.

== Miscellaneous ==
General Map - Parc del Laberint d’Horta

- The gardens hosted receptions to the sovereigns of Spain on three occasions.
- The pavilions of the intermediate terrace were chosen by poet Joan Maragall to represent classic plays. On 10 October 1898 was played the tragedy Iphigenia in Tauris by Goethe, translated by Maragall and directed by Adrià Gual.
- The parc was used to shoot a scene of the motion picture Perfume: The Story of a Murderer by German director Tom Tykwer.
- The parc was used to shoot the Music Video "Laberinto en 5 y 4" by a Japanese Violinist TSUMUZI

== Image gallery ==
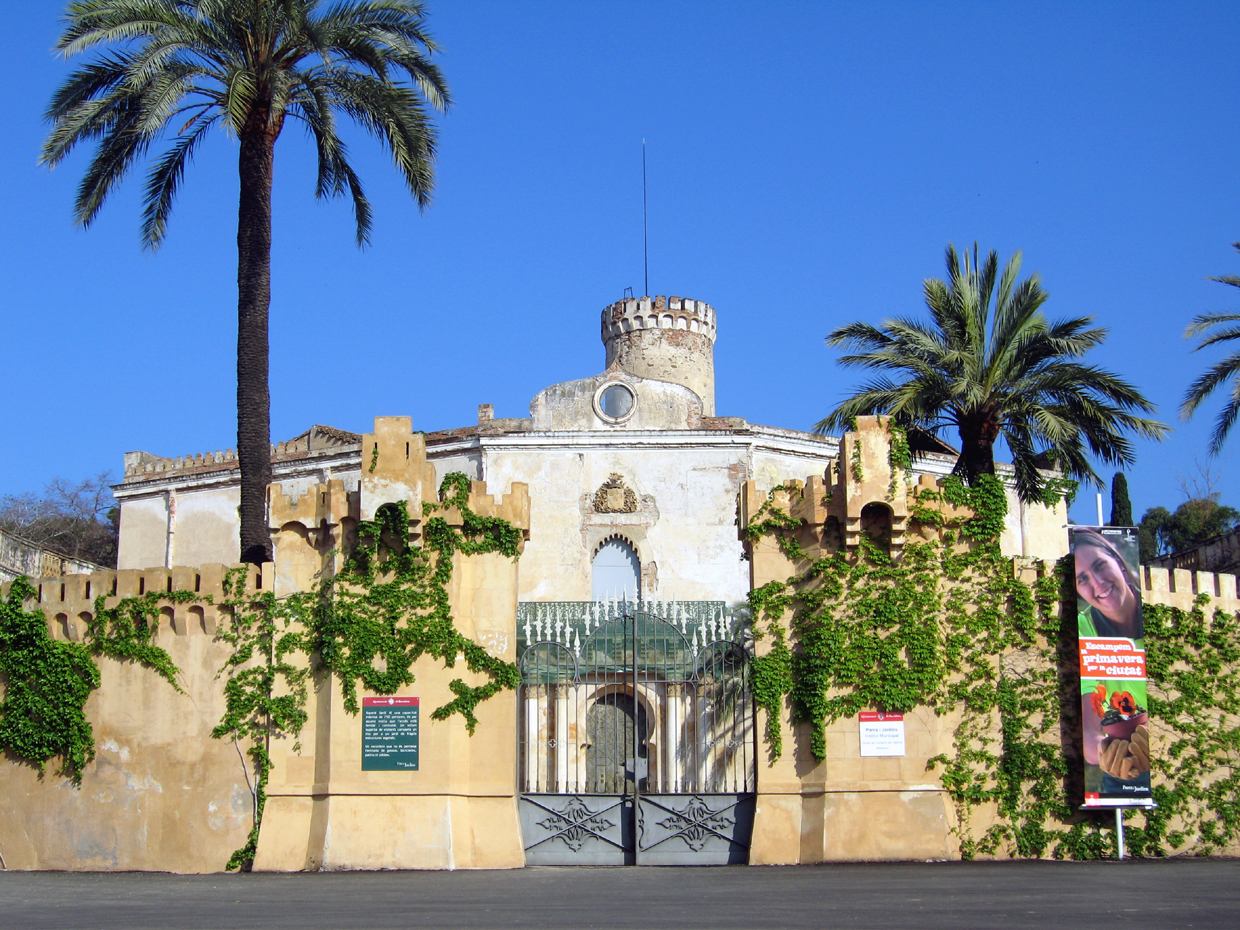
Desvalls Palace

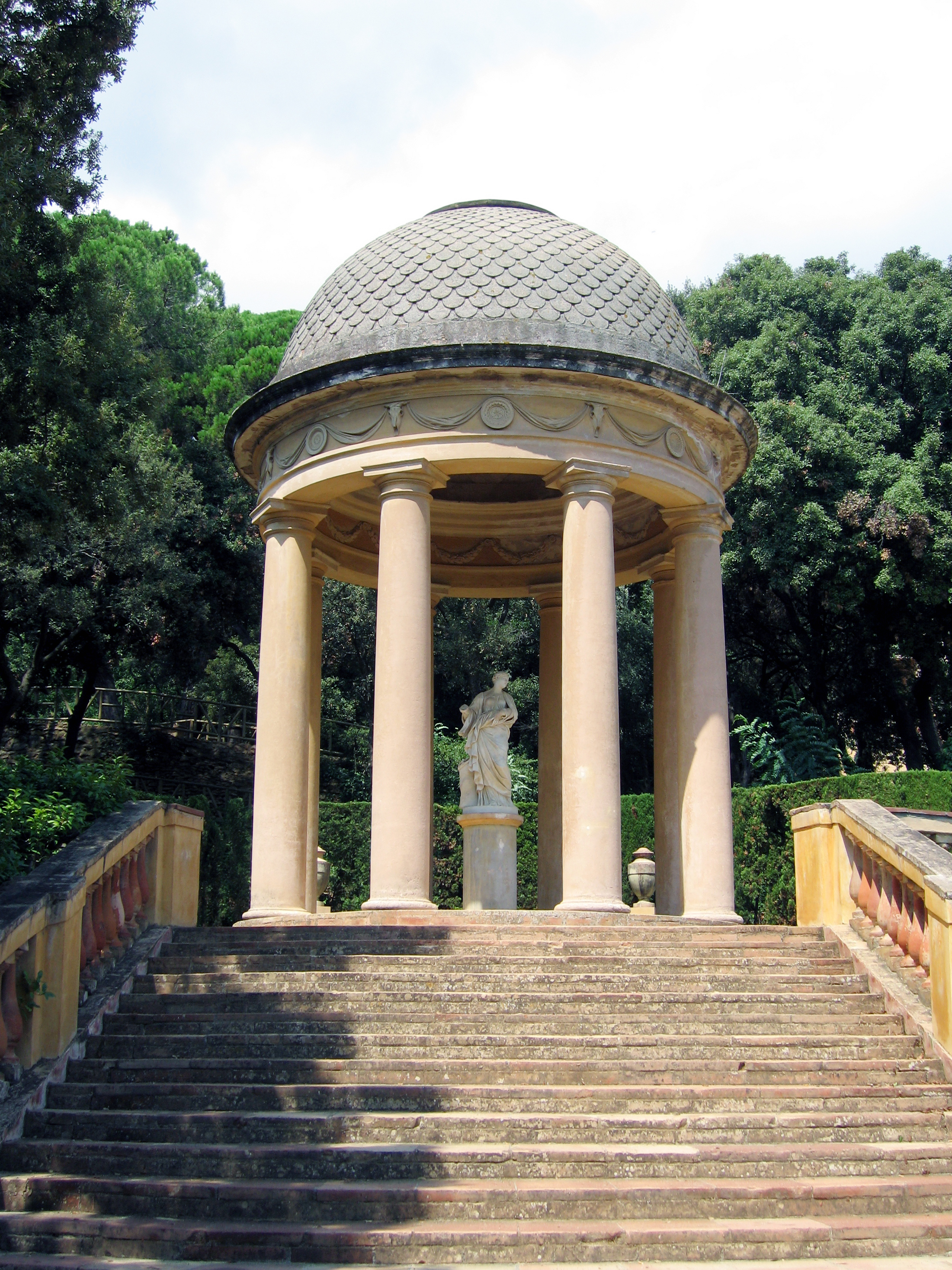
Danae Pavilion

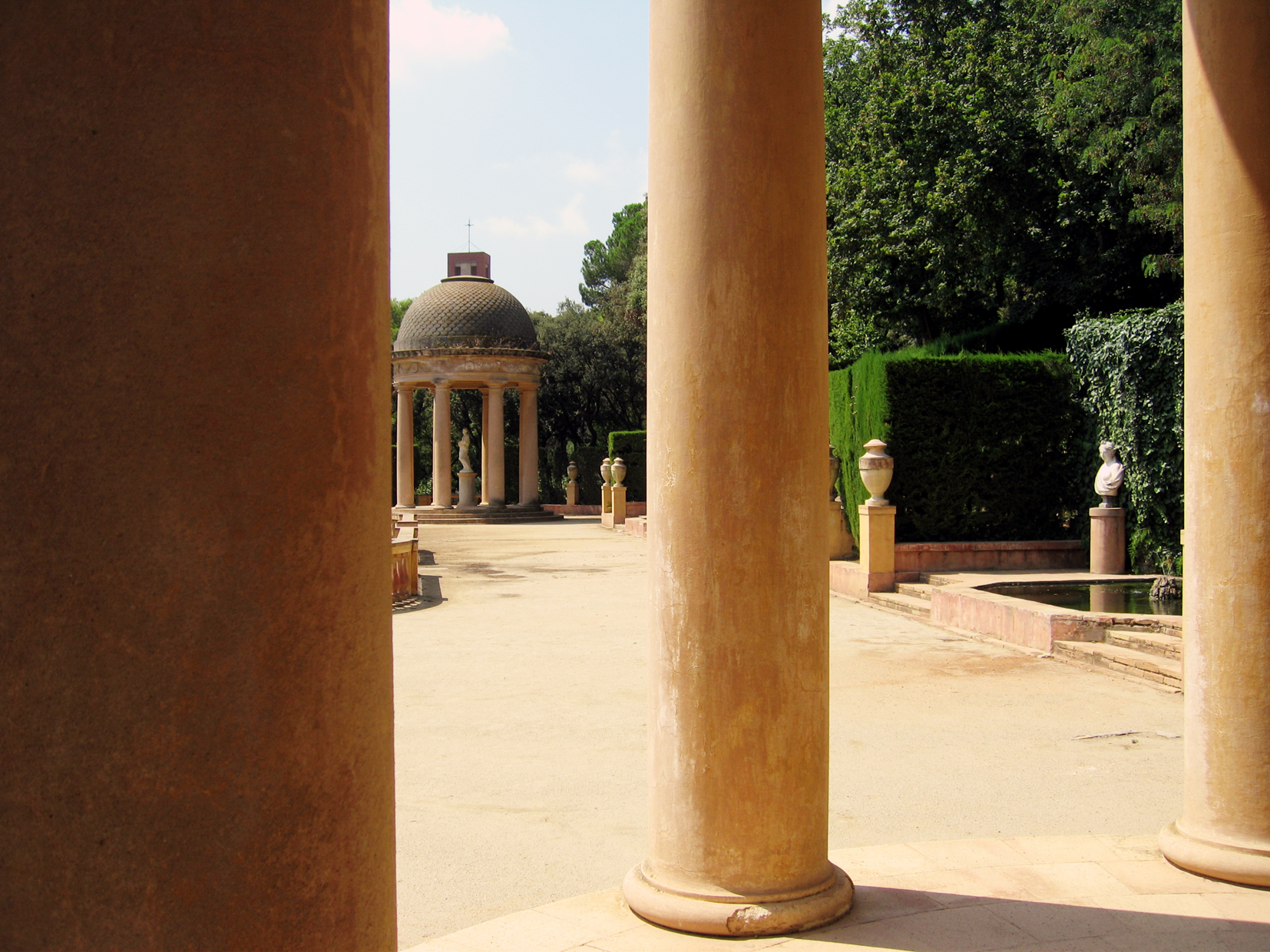
The two pavilions

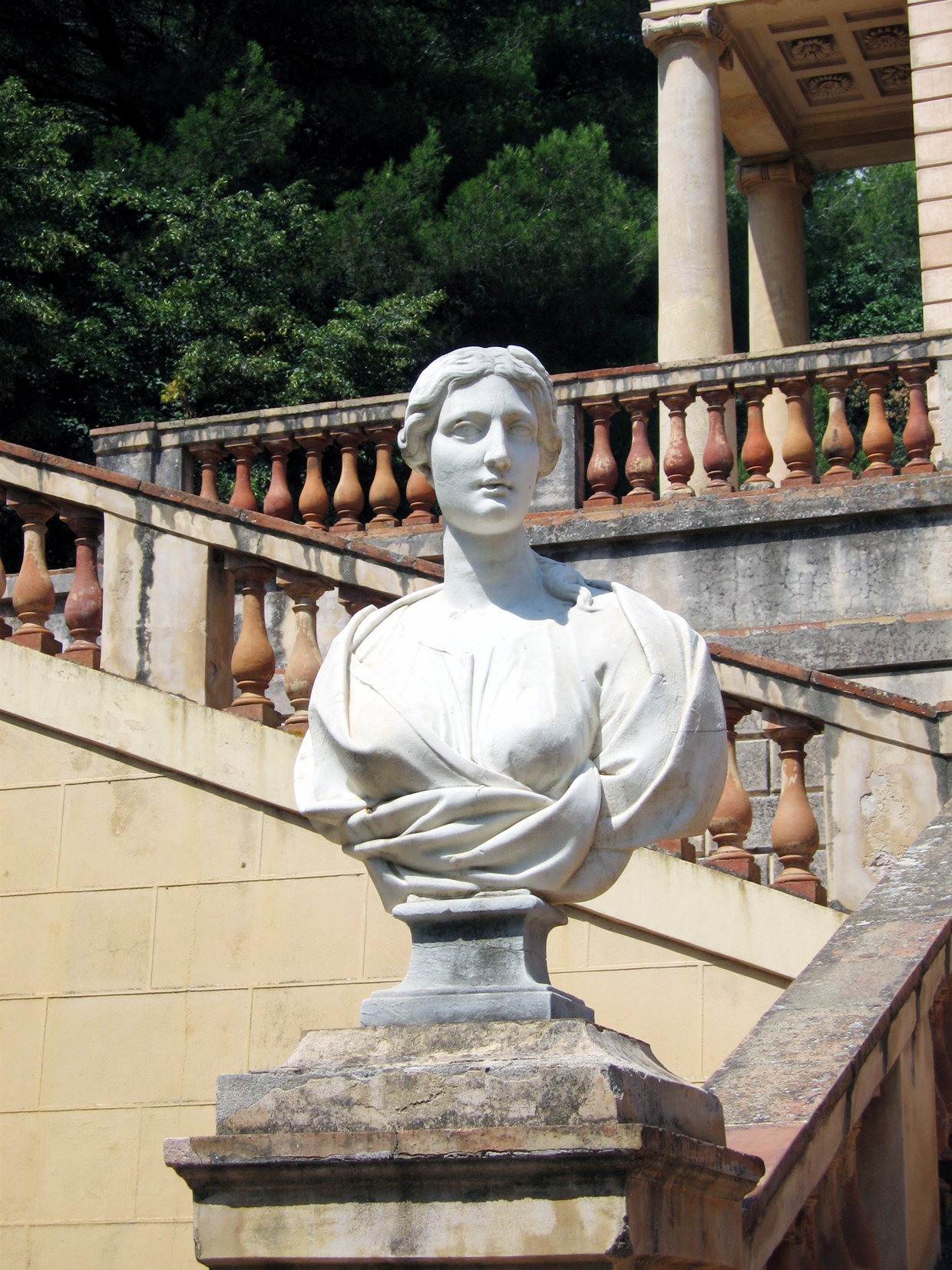
Dionysus bust

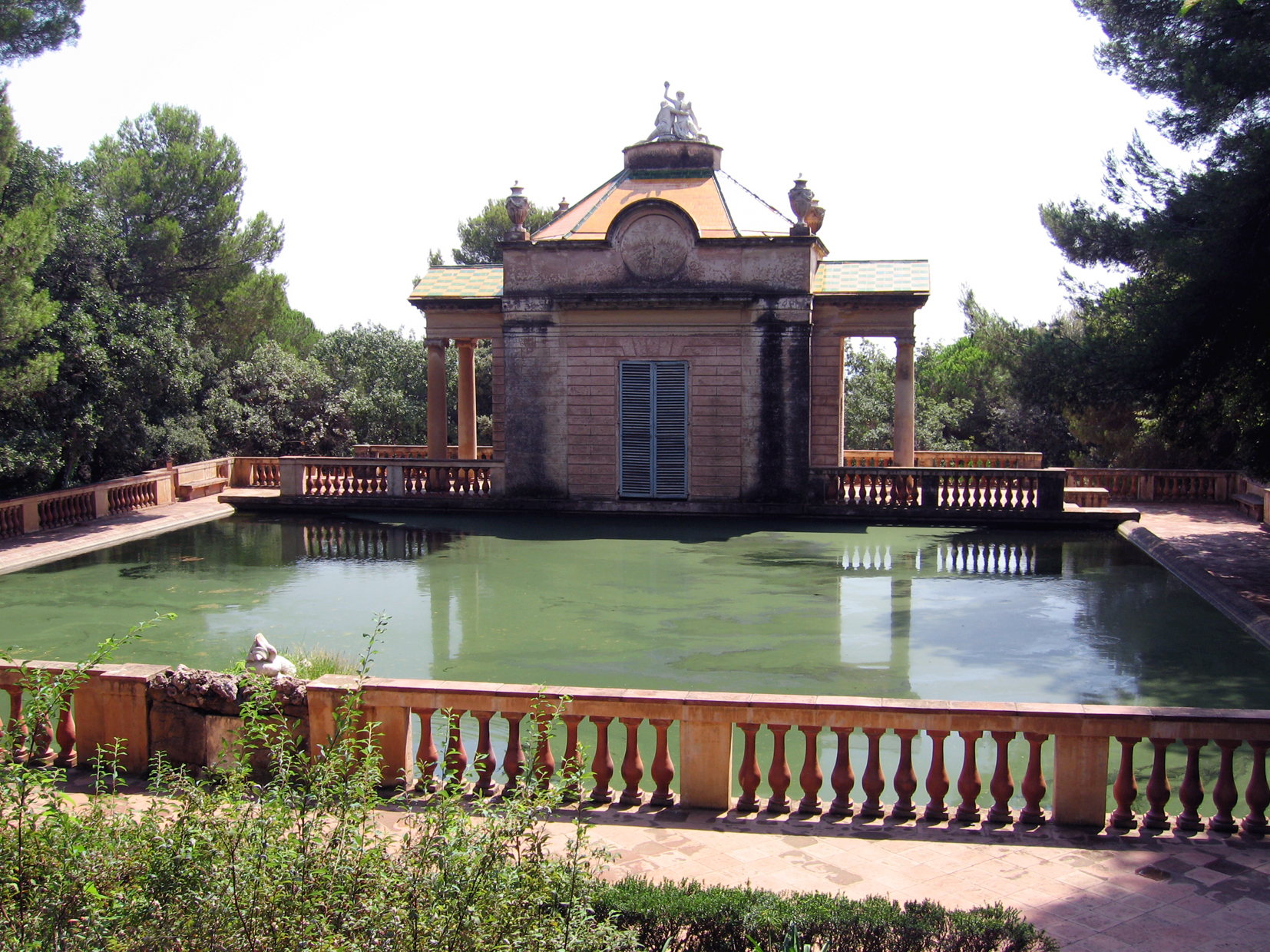
Neoclassical pavilion

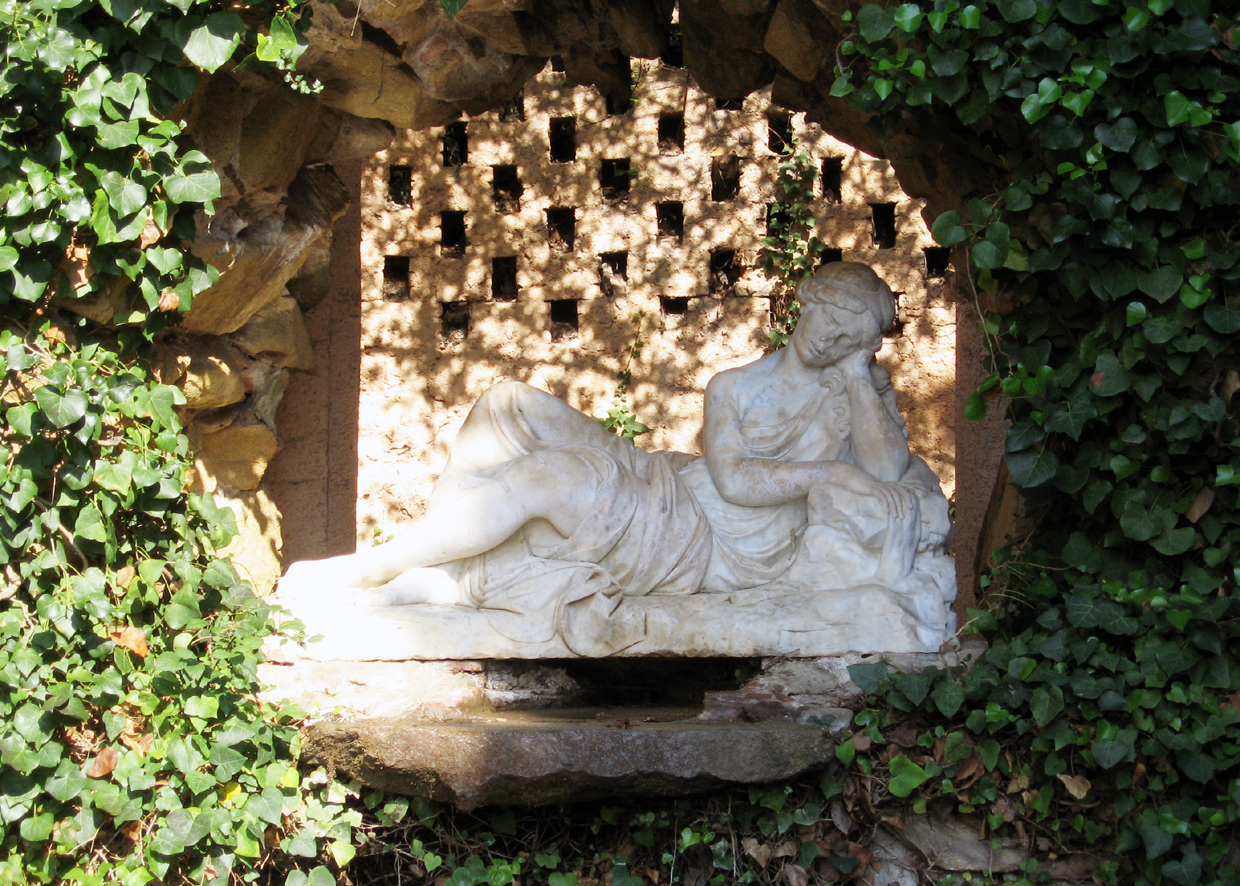
Egeria's fountain

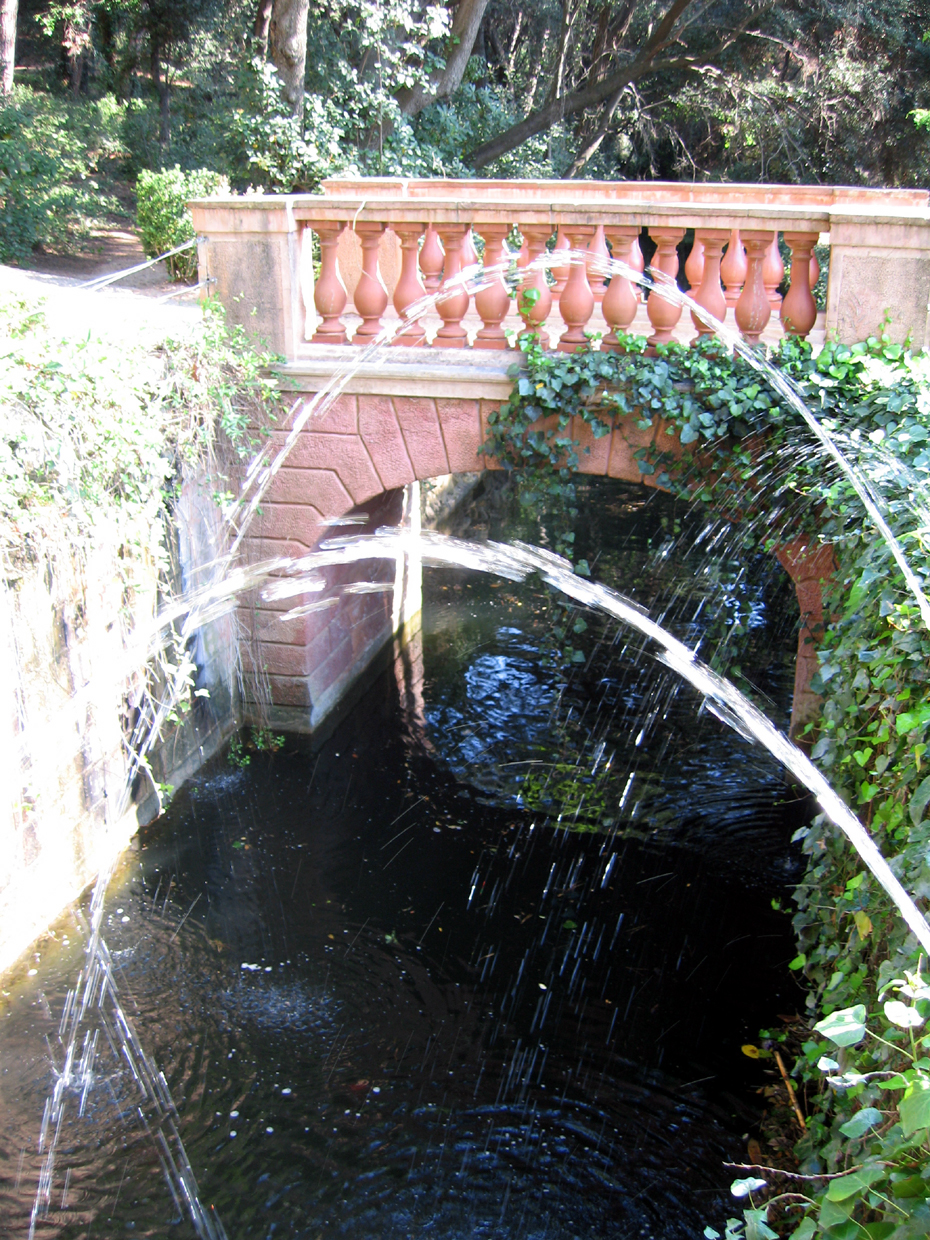
The canal

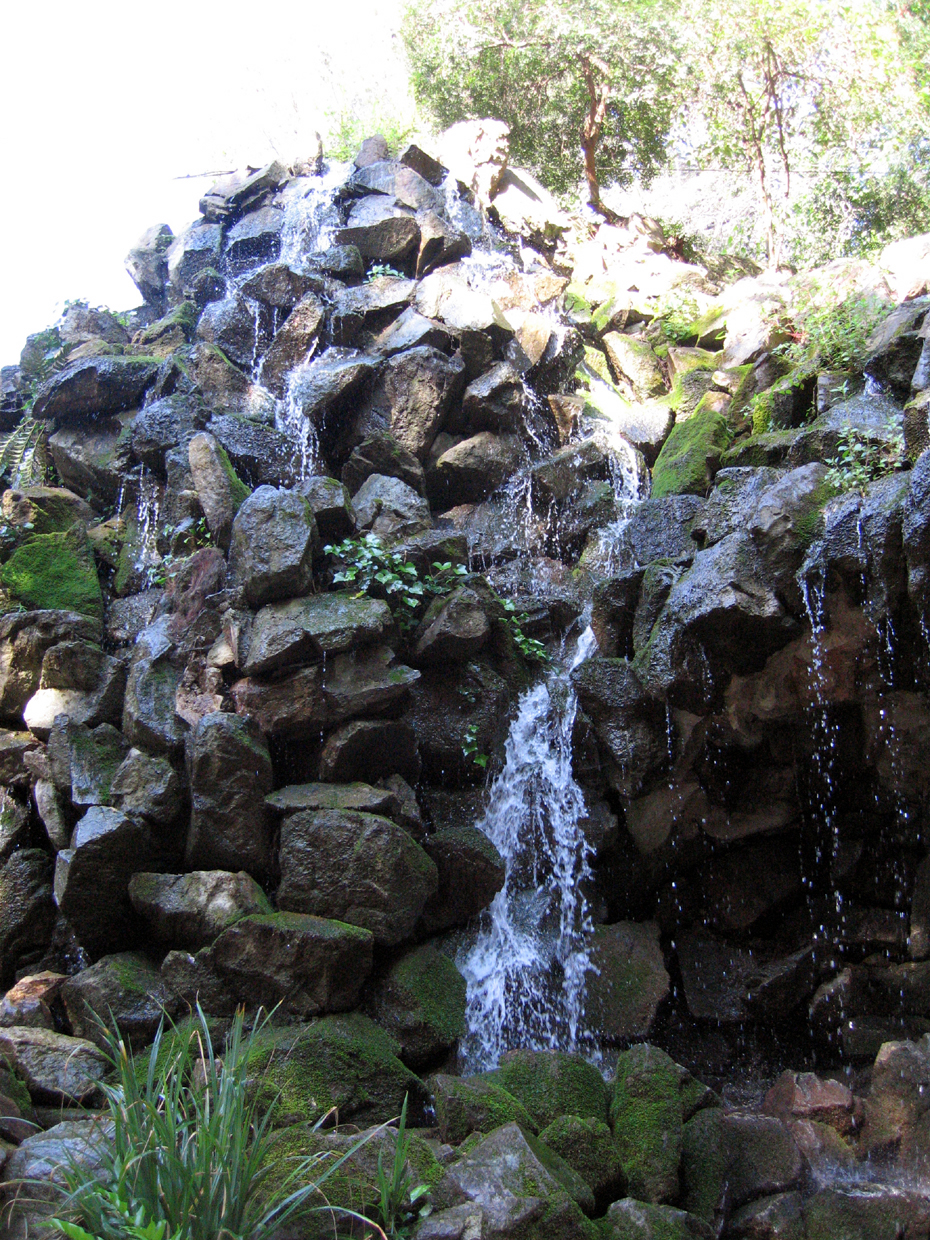
The romantic garden waterfall

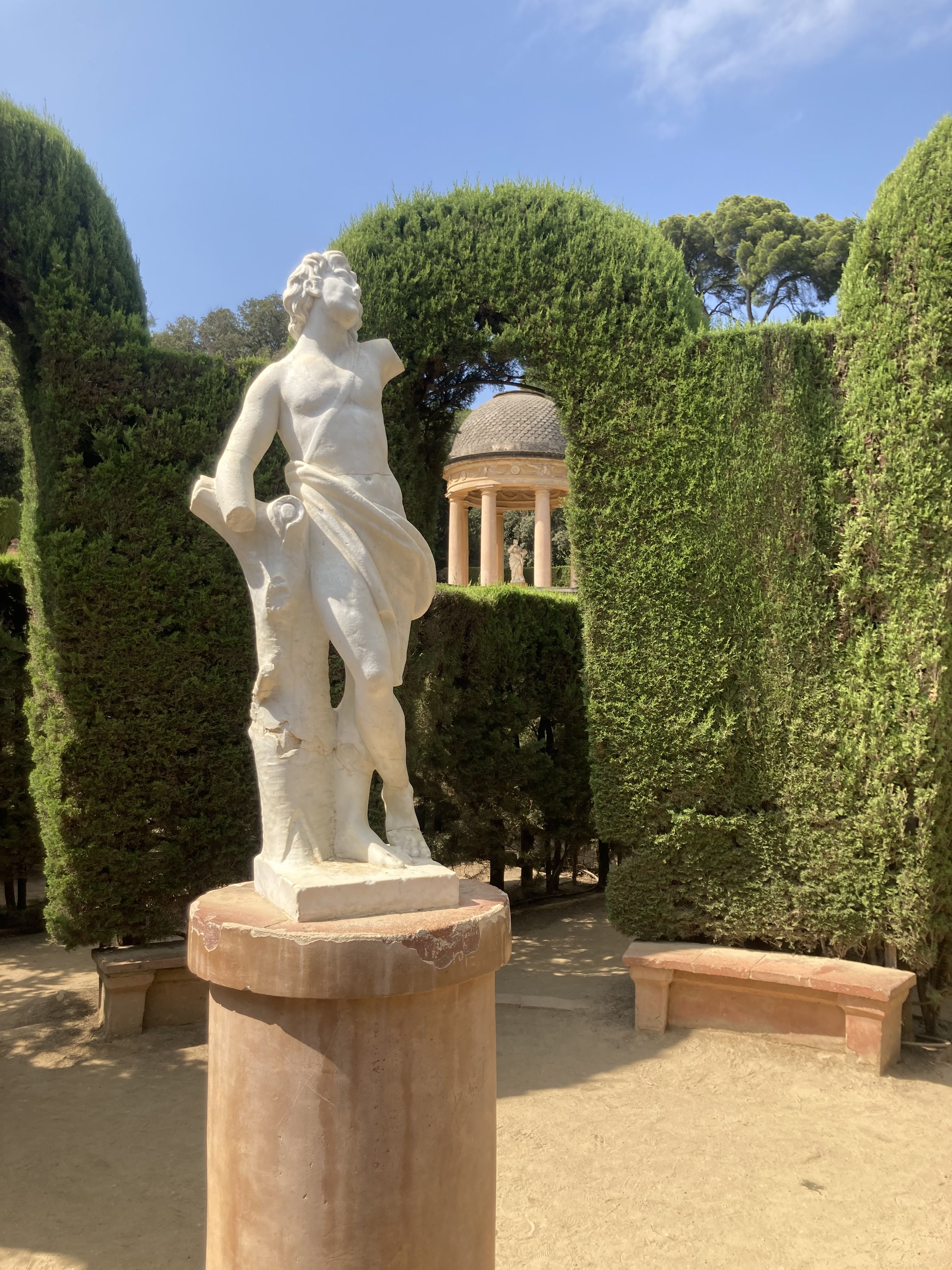
Eros en el Laberint sculpture

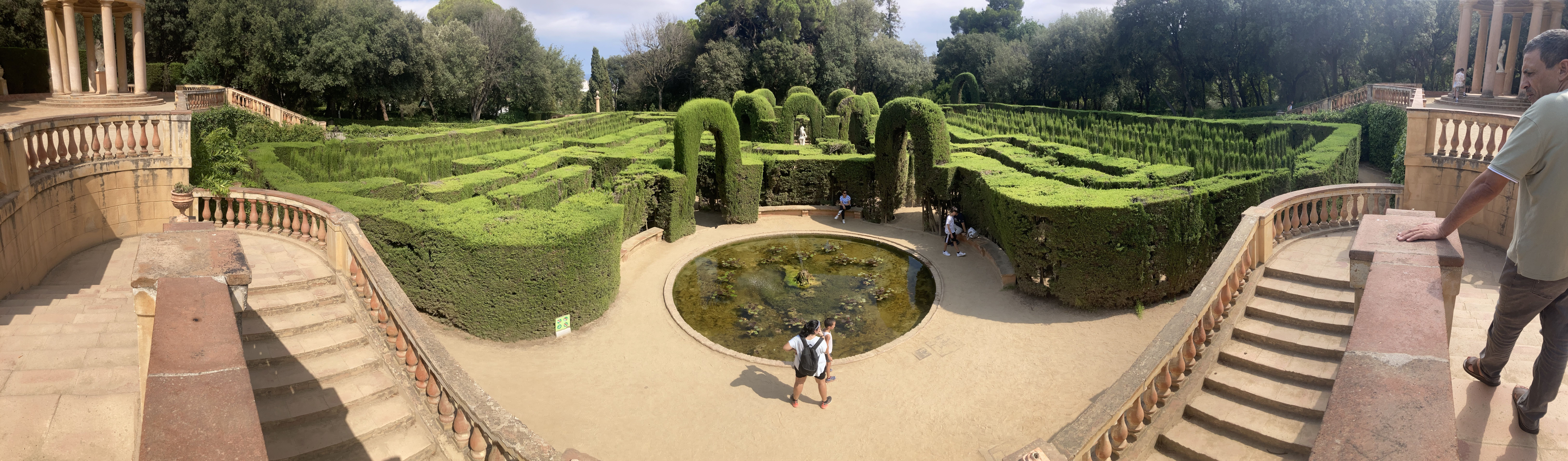
Hedge maze

== See also ==
- Parks and gardens of Barcelona
- Street names in Barcelona
- Urban planning of Barcelona
