= Bartolozzi =

Bartolozzi is an Italian surname. Notable people with the surname include the following:

- Bruno Bartolozzi (1911–1980), Italian composer
- Francesco Bartolozzi (1725–1815), Italian engraver
- Gaetano Stefano Bartolozzi (1757–1821), Italian engraver, son of Francesco Bartolozzi
- Waldemaro Bartolozzi (1927–2020), Italian racing cyclist
