= Fiat Talento =

The Fiat Talento (Italian pronunciation: [ˈfiːat taˈlɛnto]) is a light commercial vehicle produced by the Italian automaker Fiat, first sold in 1981. It is offered in 2 non consecutive generations.

- First generation (1981–1993): short wheelbase version of the Fiat Ducato.
- Second generation (2016–2020): rebadged variant of the Renault Trafic. Sold from July 2016 to September 2020.
- Discontinuation. Around September 2020 that Fiat would be discontinuing Talento it has been succeeded by the Fiat Scudo in 2022 due to upcoming merger with Stellantis
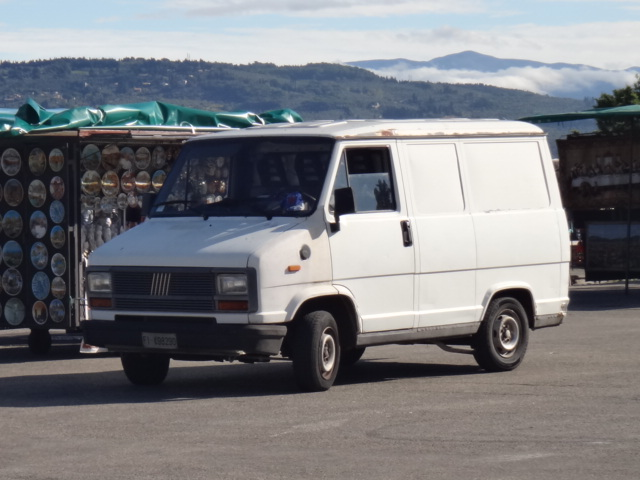
Fiat Talento (first generation)

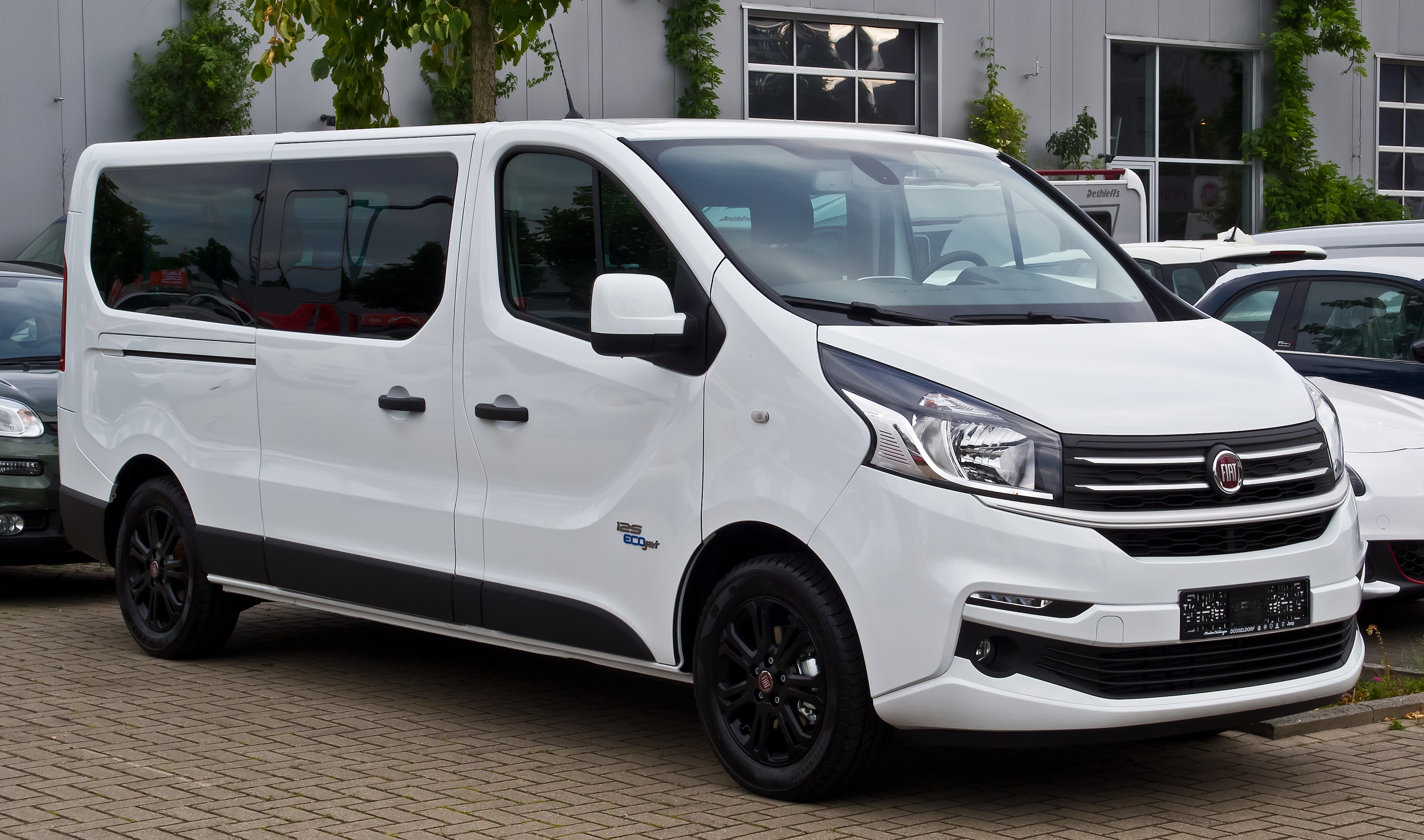
Fiat Talento (second generation)
