= 2008 Barcelona terror plot =

Failed terrorist attack in Barcelona, Spain

- Location: Barcelona, Spain
- Date: 18–19 January 2008
- Target: Barcelona Metro, Barcelona
- Attack type: Suicide bombings
- Weapon: explosives
- Deaths: 0
- Injuries: 0
- Perpetrator: Tehreek-e-Taliban Pakistan
- Motive: Islamic extremism

The terrorist organization Tehreek-e-Taliban Pakistan (TTP) planned a terror attack in the city of Barcelona, which was stopped a few days before they intended to perform it. They intended to conduct a suicide bombing on the Barcelona Metro. The metro plot was intended to become the first of a series attacks in Spain, Germany, France, Portugal and the United Kingdom as those countries contributed to the International Security Assistance Force in Afghanistan, with the timing determined by al Qaeda making political demands through Taliban leader Baitullah Mehsud.

== Arrests and indictment ==
Some 14 people – twelve Pakistanis and two Indians – were arrested between 18 and 19 January 2008 in the Raval multicultural neighborhood in Barcelona.

The police searched four private homes, an industrial site turned into an Islamic prayer room and a bakery. One of the arrested cooperated with the intelligence services and became a protected witness. The police operation was authorized by Audiencia Nacional court after receiving information from the National Intelligence Centre (CNI).

A number of books, pamphlets and other media containing radical Islamist ideas such as jihad and martyrdom were found by the Guardia Civil.

Of the 14 detained, all were subjected to detention without contact to the outside world and transferred to Madrid. Two were released without charges on 22 January and two were released on 23 January and the remaining ten, of which nine Pakistanis and one Indian, were unconditionally provisionally imprisoned. On 14 March 2009, another member of the group who had left Barcelona before the police operation was arrested in Dutch city of Breda.

Eight of the suspects, Maroof Ahmed Mirza, Mohammad Ayub Elahi Bibi, Mohamed Tarik, Qadeer Malik, Hafeez Ahmed, Roshan Jamal Khan, Shaib Iqbal and Imram Cheemawere were accused of being members of a terrorist organization and possessing explosives. The last three, Mohammed Shoaib, Mehmooh Khalid and Aqueel Ur Rahmnan Abassi, were only accused of belonging to a terrorist organization. The charges were upheld by the Audiencia Nacional in a 9 October 2009 trial. The judge concluded the constituted an organized group adhering to extremist Islamist ideology.

Six of the sentenced were legal immigrants to Spain and most of those had lived in Spain since 2001. Five others arrived to Spain in the months prior to the plot.

Months later, the Pakistani Taliban spokesman, claimed the attack in a video statement, which was posted on the Internet.

== See also ==
- 2017 Barcelona attacks
