= 800 Meters =

- Genre: Docu-series
- Directed by: Elías León Siminiani
- Country of origin: Spain
- Original language: Spanish
- No. of seasons: 1
- No. of episodes: 3

Production
- Running time: 51–53 minutes
- Production company: Bambú Producciones

Original release
- Release: March 25, 2022

800 Meters (Spanish: 800 metros) is a 2022 Netflix docuseries about the 2017 Barcelona attacks, directed by Elías León Siminiani. The series consists of three parts.

== Episodes ==
No.	Title	Original release date
1	"A Group of Friends"	March 25, 2022
2	"Something Happened on La Rambla"	March 25, 2022
3	"Two Hours Later"	March 25, 2022

== Production ==
Over 200 hours of footage were filmed for this project, and around 80 interview were done.
