= Enric Masó i Vázquez =

Catalan engineer and politician

Enric Massó i Vázquez (1924–2009) was a Catalan engineer and mayor of Barcelona from 1973 to 1975.
