= Parks and gardens of Barcelona =

Parks and gardens in Barcelona

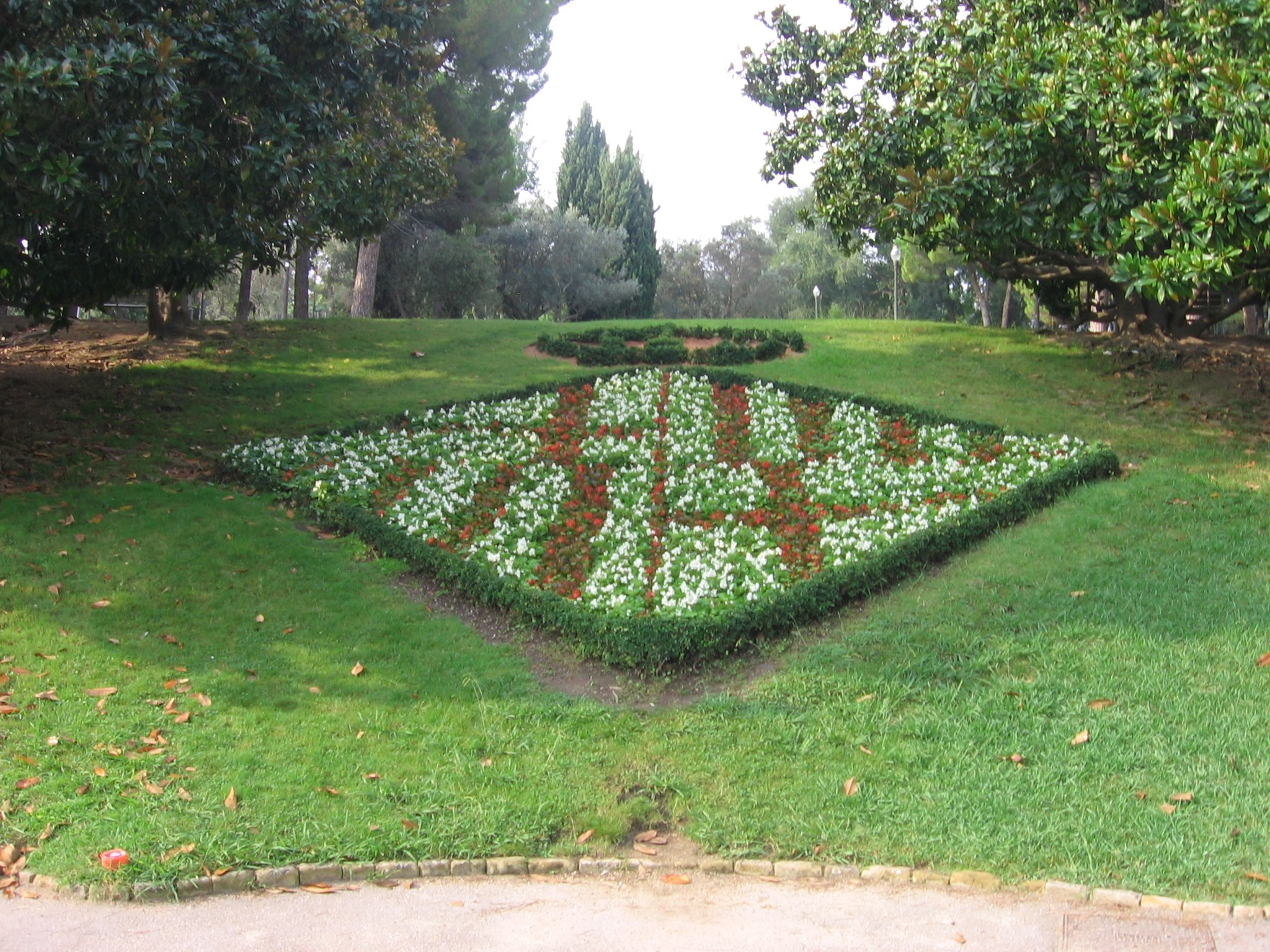
Floral arrangement with the coat of arms of Barcelona, gardens of Mossèn Cinto Verdaguer.

The parks and gardens of Barcelona cover an area of 2,784 hectares. (Note: Of the total 2784 hectares, 1795 correspond to the Serra de Collserola, and the rest to green areas, including public parks and gardens, roadside trees (150,912 units), planters (3,816 units), flower beds and slopes; also included are the 6 hectares corresponding to the beaches of Barcelona (2001 data) (AA.VV., 2001, p. 31).) Its management depends on the Municipal Institute of Parks and Gardens of Barcelona (in Catalan: Institut Municipal de Parcs i Jardins de Barcelona), a body under the Barcelona City Council. Since the 19th century —and especially in the 20th century— Barcelona has been committed to the development of green areas in the city, and is currently one of the European cities with the most roadside trees (150,000 units). In 2001 the Institute of Parks and Gardens received ISO 14001 certification for the conservation and management of green spaces and public roadside trees.

Gardening in Barcelona has had an uneven evolution over time: the first significant project, the Labyrinth of Horta park, dates back to the 18th century; the first large public park in Barcelona, the Citadel, was opened in the 19th century; but most of the green areas in the city date from the 20th century, a period in which public gardening in the Catalan capital was given a great boost. In this last century gardening has developed mainly in four phases: the first planning carried out by Léon Jaussely in his plan of connections and by Nicolau Maria Rubió i Tudurí, author of an ambitious plan of concentric green areas throughout the city, from Montjuïc to the Besòs; the post-war period saw a setback in the creation of green spaces, mainly due to real estate speculation that led to an increase in the population due to immigration, as well as the priority given to road traffic due to the increase in the number of cars. With the arrival of democracy there was a new impulse to the creation of landscaped spaces, with a predominance of architectural design and a multipurpose sense of space, which added to the plant element service areas and leisure and recreational facilities for the population; finally, towards the end of the century a more naturalistic trend emerged, more in line with the new ideas of ecology and environmental sustainability, with concern not only for parks and large green areas but also for the placement of groves in streets and promenades of the city.

Depending on their characteristics, Barcelona's parks and gardens are divided into several typologies: "historical", those created before 1950, such as the Parc del Laberint d'Horta, the Parc de la Ciutadella, Parc Güell, the gardens of the University of Barcelona, those of Laribal and those of the Palau Reial de Pedralbes; "thematic", which are dedicated to a certain type of plant species, such as the Parc de Cervantes, dedicated to roses, the Mossèn Costa i Llobera gardens, specialized in cacti and succulents, and the Mossèn Cinto Verdaguer gardens, dedicated to aquatic, bulbous and rhizomatous plants; "urban" are the most common type, parks and gardens located in the city and open to all public, with services and multipurpose spaces for the enjoyment of all citizens; and "forest", green spaces of wide extension generally located in areas bordering the city, such as the Sierra de Collserola and the mountain of Montjuïc.

Besides the parks and gardens administrated by the municipality, a number of self-managed, often occupied, green spaces and gardens exist in Barcelona.

== Characteristics ==
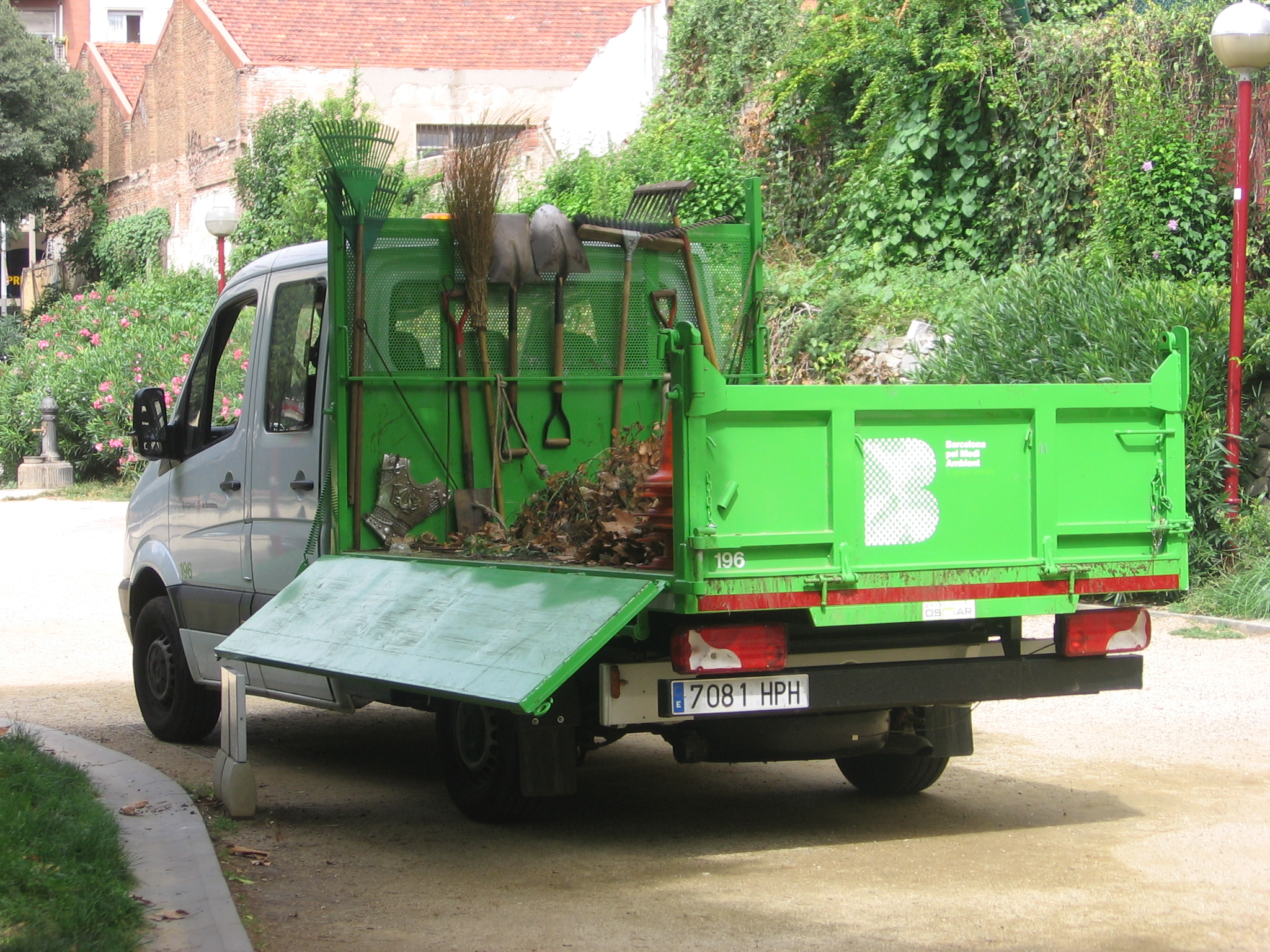
Above, a Barcelona Parks and Gardens truck. Below, workers of the department.

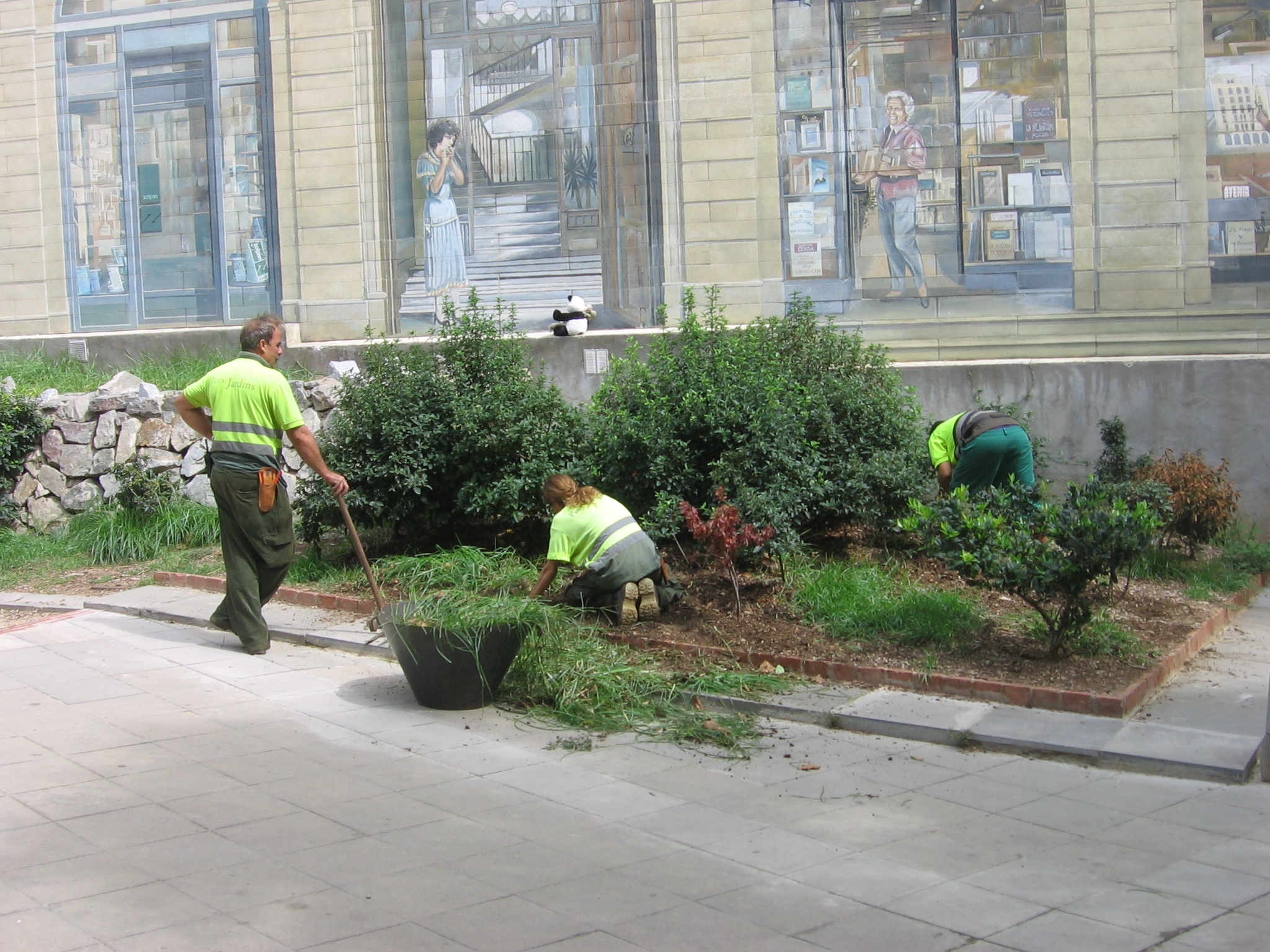

Barcelona, capital of the autonomous community of Catalonia, is located in the Spanish Levante region, on the Mediterranean coast. It is located on a plain about 11 km long and 6 km wide, bounded on its sides by the sea and by the Sierra de Collserola —with the summit of Tibidabo (516.2 m) as its highest point— as well as by the deltas of the Besòs and Llobregat rivers. The city's climate is Mediterranean, of the sub-humid maritime xerophytic type, with an average annual temperature of 16.4 °C and a relative humidity of 70%. Rainfall is mainly between October and April, scarce in winter and minimal in summer, with rainfall of 578.74 l/m^{2} (1997-2002).

The vegetation is Mediterranean, with a predominance of perennial species. The typical forest is encinar (Quercus ilex), and there are also some subtropical species, which need constant irrigation to live outdoors, such as the naranjo (Citrus × sinensis), limonero (Citrus × limon), mimosa (Acacia dealbata), araucaria (Araucaria heterophylla), eucalyptus (Eucalyptus globulus) and palm (Phoenix dactylifera). Some species originating in Japan, which has a climate similar to the Mediterranean but with more rainfall in summer, have been acclimatized, such as the pittosporum (Pittosporum tobira) and the spindle (Euonymus japonicus). Of conifers, the most adaptable is the Atlas cedar (Cedrus atlantica), as well as cypress (Cupressus sempervirens) and thuja (Thuja standishii). Species from other regions of the world with Mediterranean climates, such as California, South Africa, Australia and Chile, have also adapted.

In relation to each specific area of the city, vegetation can vary according to climatic conditions, water resources, altitude, sun exposure, erosion levels, rainfall and wind action. In favorable conditions, species such as pine (Pinus pinea), holm oak (Quercus ilex) and wild olive (Olea europaea sylvestris) predominate; in less favorable conditions, there are phytosystems called maquis, with trees such as the carob tree (Ceratonia siliqua) and the palm tree (Phoenix dactylifera), or shrubs such as the strawberry tree (Arbutus unedo), the laurel (Laurus nobilis), the myrtle (Myrtus communis), the rosemary (Salvia rosmarinus) or the mastic tree (Pistacia lentiscus); and in unfavorable conditions, there is garrigue-type vegetation, with free soil and little growth, with xerophytic species such as the gayomba (Spartium junceum), lavender (Lavandula angustifolia), thyme (Thymus vulgaris) and salvia (Salvia officinalis).

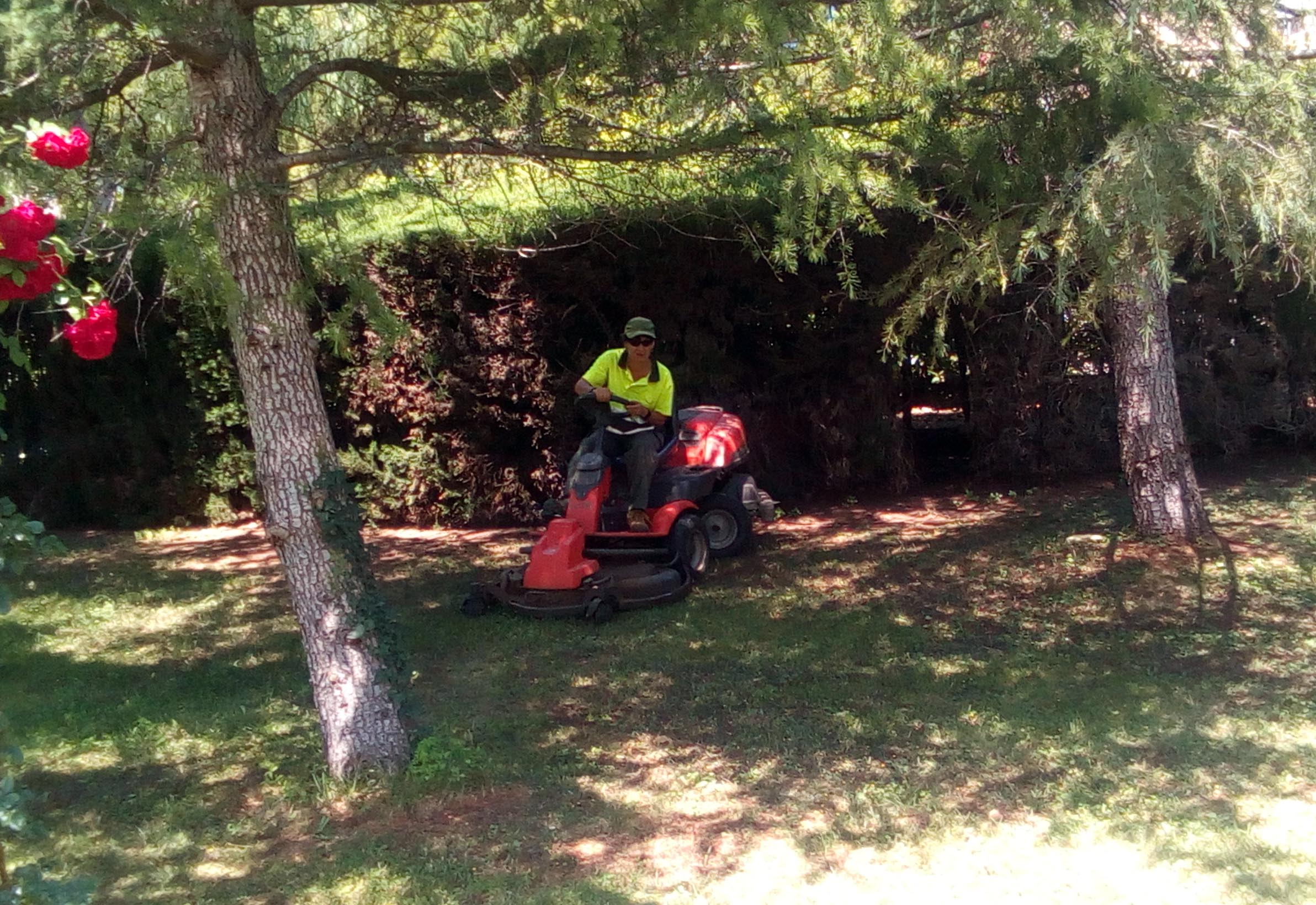
Lawn mower in Cervantes Park.

The city's tree grove is composed of a total of 140 species, of which the most common are: London plane (Platanus × hispanica), honeyberry (Celtis australis), elm (Ulmus pumila), Japanese acacia (Sophora japonica), acacia (Robinia pseudoacacia), rosewood (Tipuana tipu), "bottle tree" (Brachychiton populneum), Lombardy poplar (Populus nigra 'Italica'), Japanese privet (Ligustrum lucidum), chinaberry tree (Melia azedarach), black maple (Acer negundo) and bitter orange (Citrus aurantium).

In 1983 the Barcelona City Council initiated a Catalog of Trees of Local Interest, which classifies a group of trees, palms and shrubs that have special relevance due to their botanical value, historical interest or any other significant component for the conservation of the city's green areas. These trees are specially protected, as they cannot be uprooted or affected by any urban development operation. The choice of catalogued species is made by means of a series of parameters that analyze each specimen according to aspects such as age, measurements, history or aesthetic qualities (see here the list of trees of local interest).

The actions of the Municipal Institute of Parks and Gardens have focused for years on sustainability criteria, especially with regard to the planting of native Mediterranean species, more adaptable to the terrain and less hydraulic consumption; irrigation carried out with groundwater or automated irrigation (208 hectares in 2001), where the use of irrigation controlled by hygrometers is being introduced; and the use of organic waste composting for fertilization.

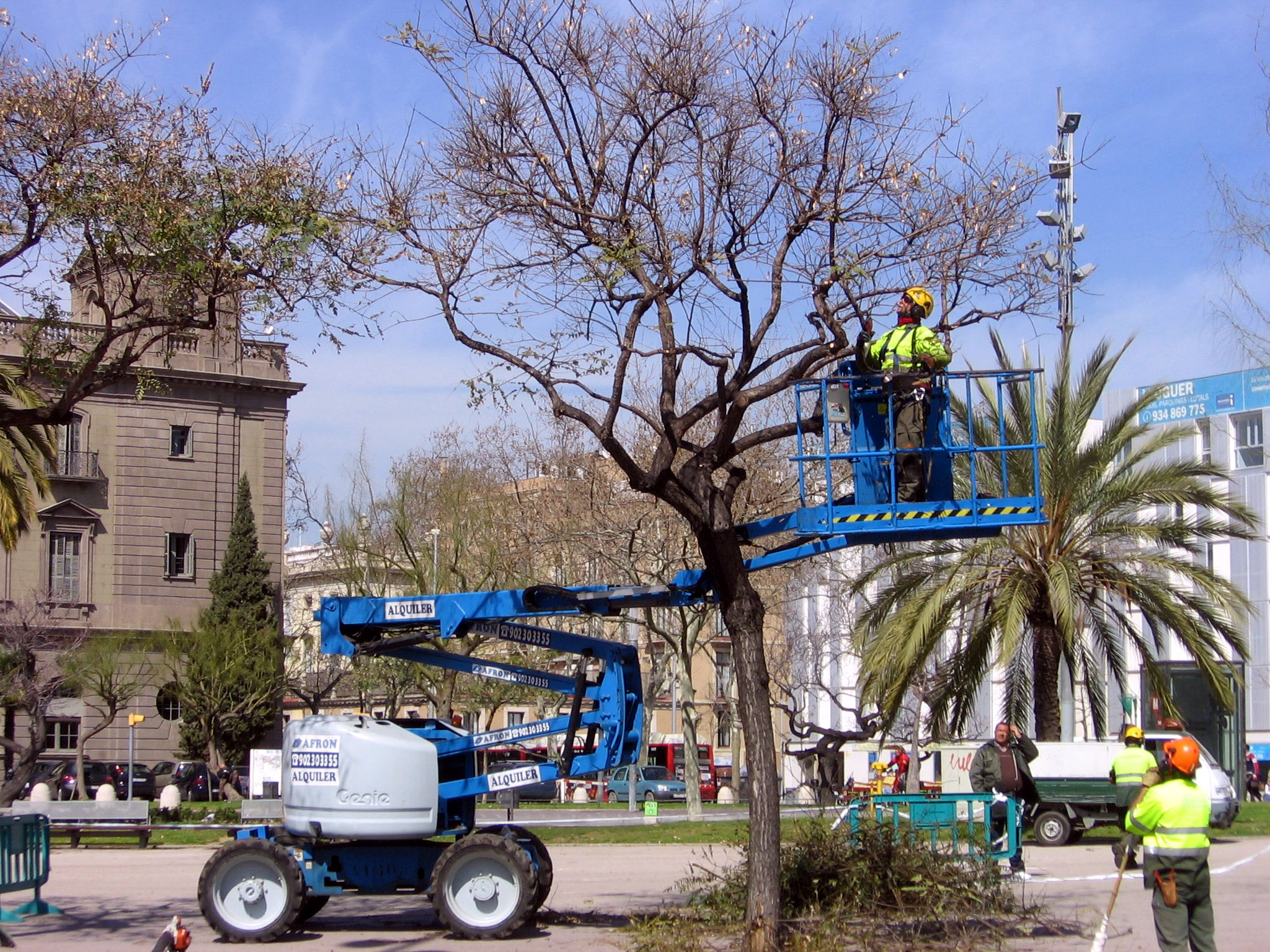
Pruning work.

Plant species are cared for according to their typology: in trees and palms, work is focused on pruning, whether it is formation, cleaning or raising the crown, or cleaning dry leaves in the case of palms, in addition to phytosanitary treatments in all these specimens; grass is the one that requires more continuous treatment, mainly mowing, as well as trimming the edges to maintain its structure, and more sporadically the aeration, priming and fertilizing of flowerbeds; as for ground cover and perennials, the former are pruned in winter, early spring and late summer, while the latter require pruning and trimming, as well as a replacement by division of bushes every two or three years; hedges need formation pruning, and maintenance with trimming in early winter and autumn; shrubs are pruned twice a year, in early summer and winter; flowers require constant care, the planting soil is usually prepared first —during the months of April, August and November—, the soil is weeded every month to aerate it and, three times a year, dried flowers are removed; In addition, general maintenance work is carried out throughout the year, such as weeding, repairing the paths and repairing or replacing street furniture, as well as general cleaning and emptying of litter garbage cans.

Another area of vital importance is phytosanitary treatments, planned according to biodiversity and integrated pest management criteria. They are divided into six modalities: cultural, through the selection of species; mechanical, through controlled pruning; biological control, with the use of certain organisms that work against parasites, through the artificial introduction of useful fauna or antagonistic microorganisms; pheromone traps, which work against a sector of the attacking species; chromatic bands, which, like flowers, attract insects; and chemical methods, which can be by plant endotherapy, consisting of the pressurized injection of the phytosanitary product into the plant, or by atomization and phytosanitary applications on the plant.

The Institute of Parks and Gardens also manages a network of urban vegetable gardens in collaboration with groups of retired people, who are responsible for their maintenance and harvesting. These are plots of between 25 and 40 m^{2}, in which vegetables and greens are grown, as well as aromatic and medicinal plants, and some seasonal flowers. There are currently 13 urban gardens scattered throughout the city.

Distribution of green areas and public services by district (2001 data):

District	Green area (ha)	Trees (u)	Planters (u)	Children playgrounds	Petanque courts	Areas for dogs
Ciutat Vella	62,43	6914	747	24	45	8
Eixample	48,74	23589	571	50	37	20
Sants-Montjuïc	286,48	14588	618	51	39	12
Les Corts	69,58	12100	136	35	16	11
Sarrià-San Gervasio	83,55	12253	287	40	31	19
Gràcia	36,55	6438	291	25	25	10
Horta-Guinardó	122,22	13424	154	79	44	21
Nou Barris	92,72	15412	252	81	28	10
Sant Andreu	54,31	15704	470	76	86	24
Sant Martí	132,09	30490	290	135	90	15
Total	988,67	150912	3816	596	441	150

Gardening elements

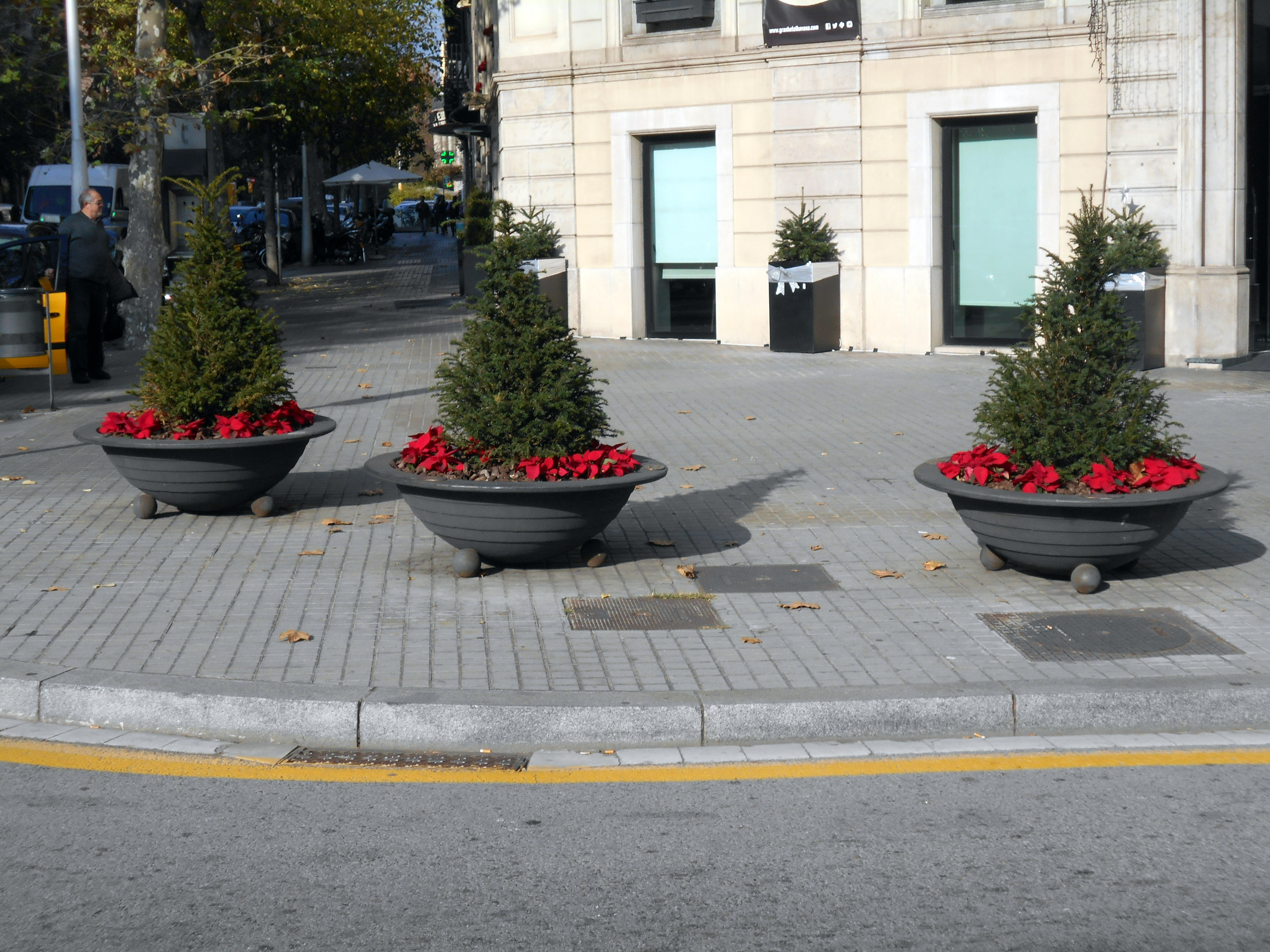
Planters.

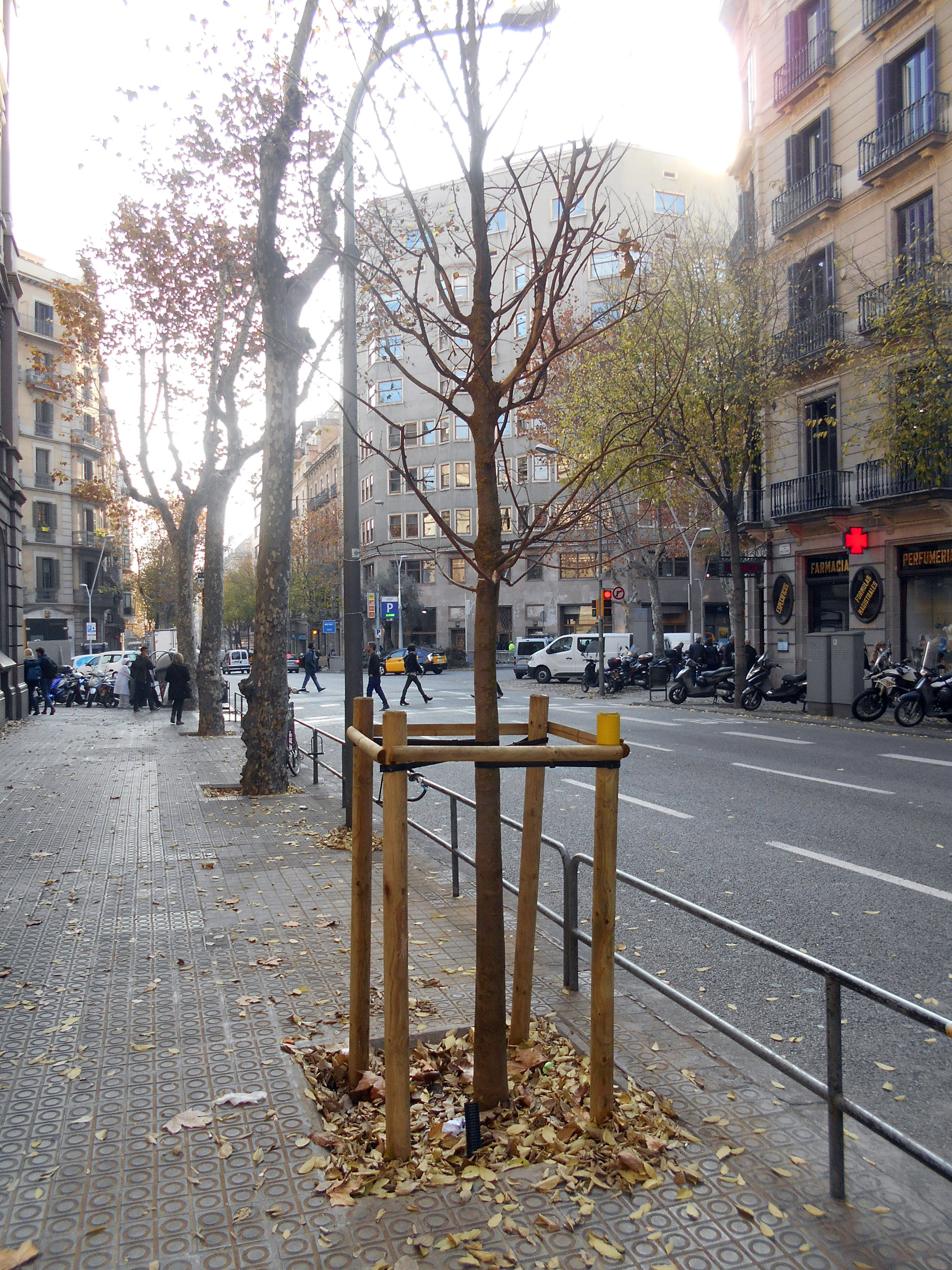
Tree guard.

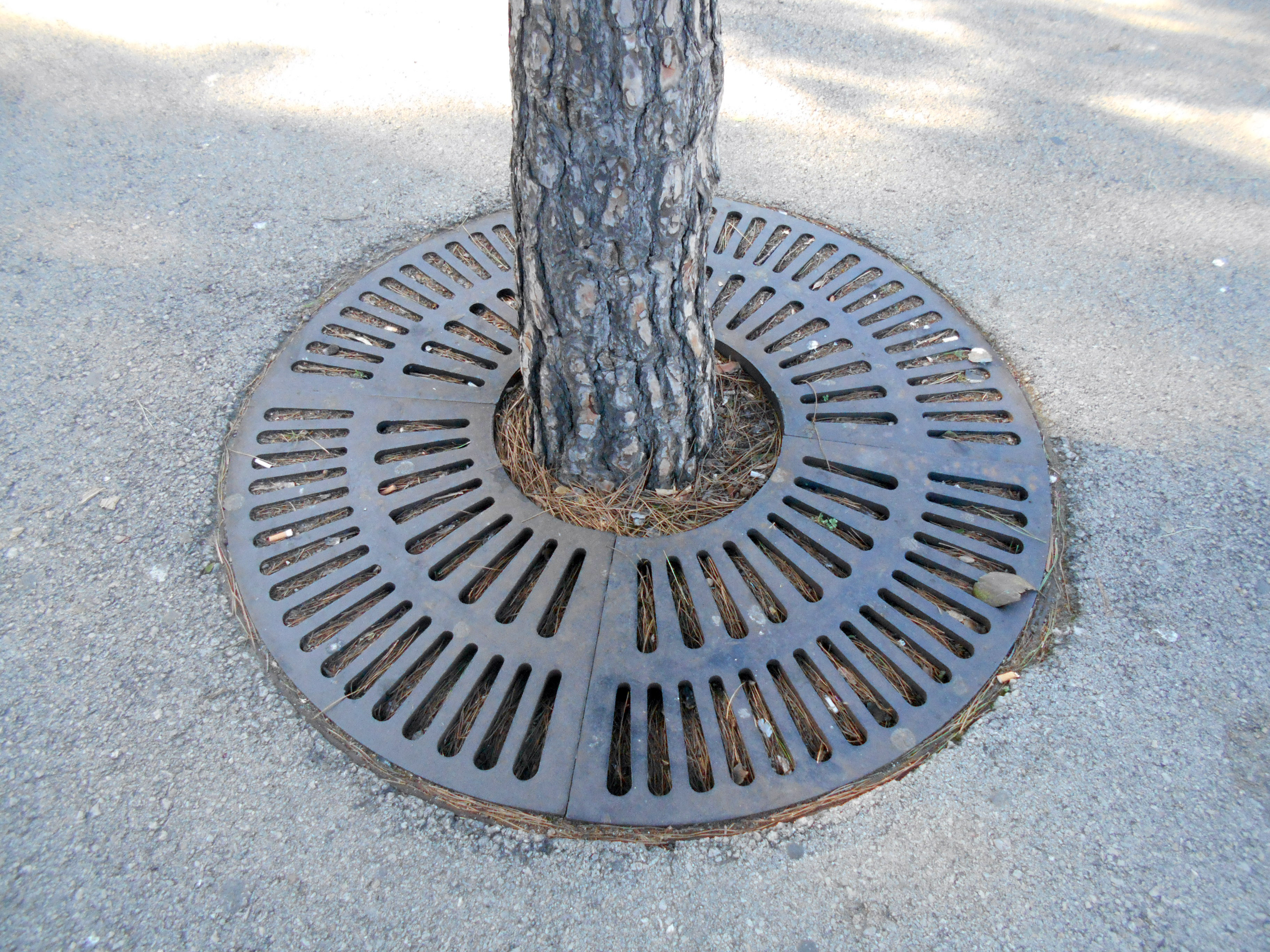
Tree pit.

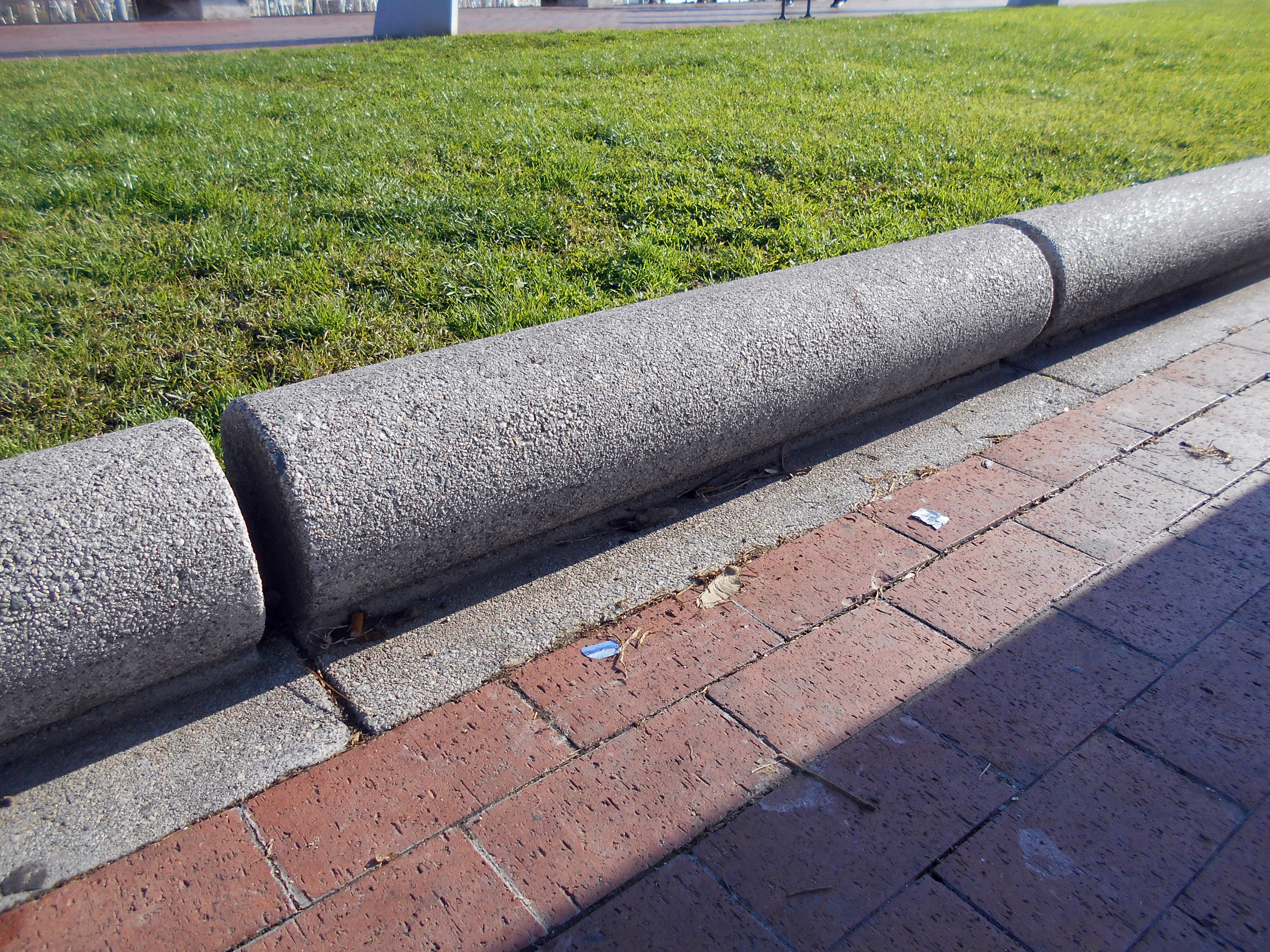
Green area limit.

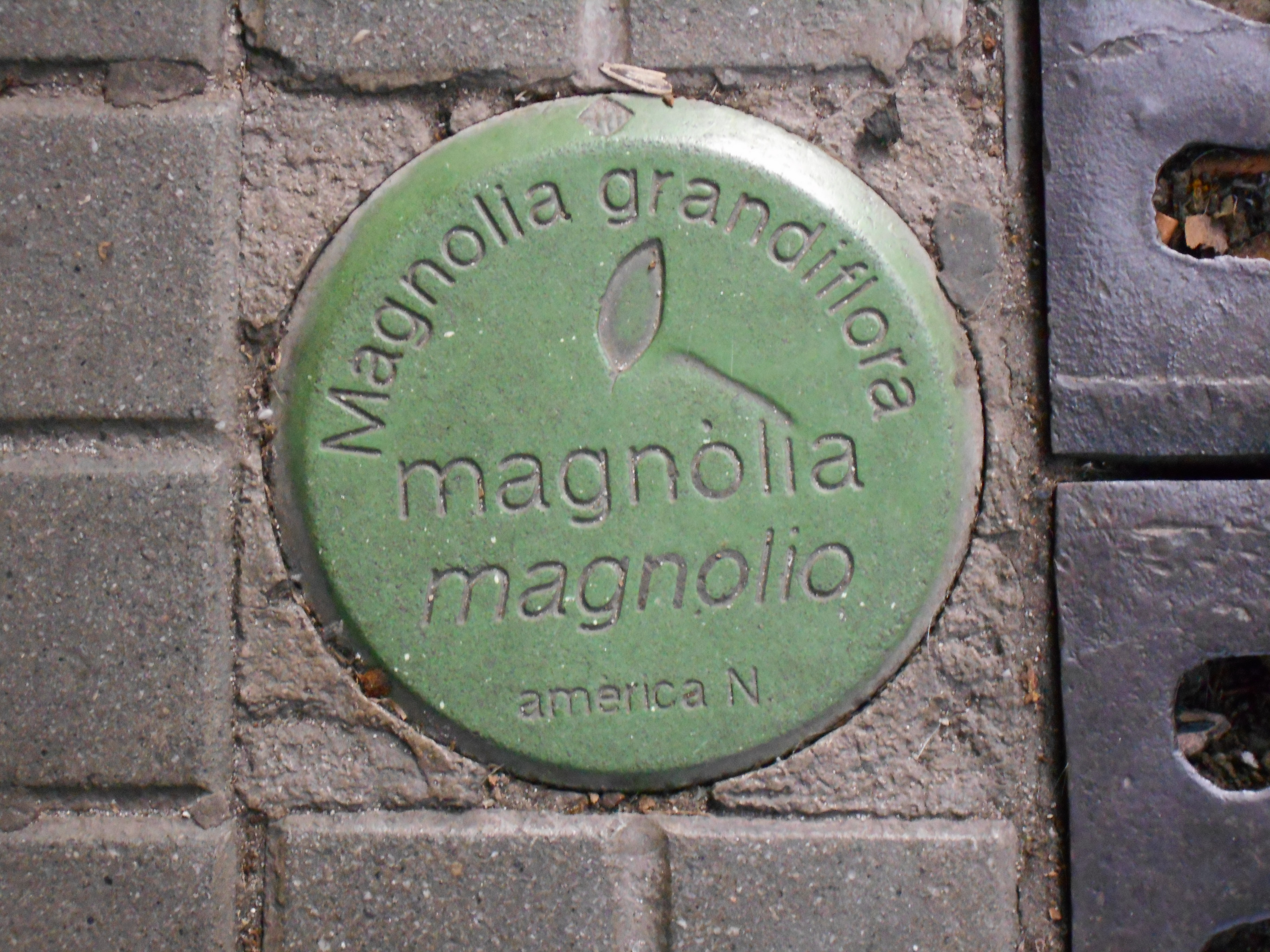
Tree identification plate.

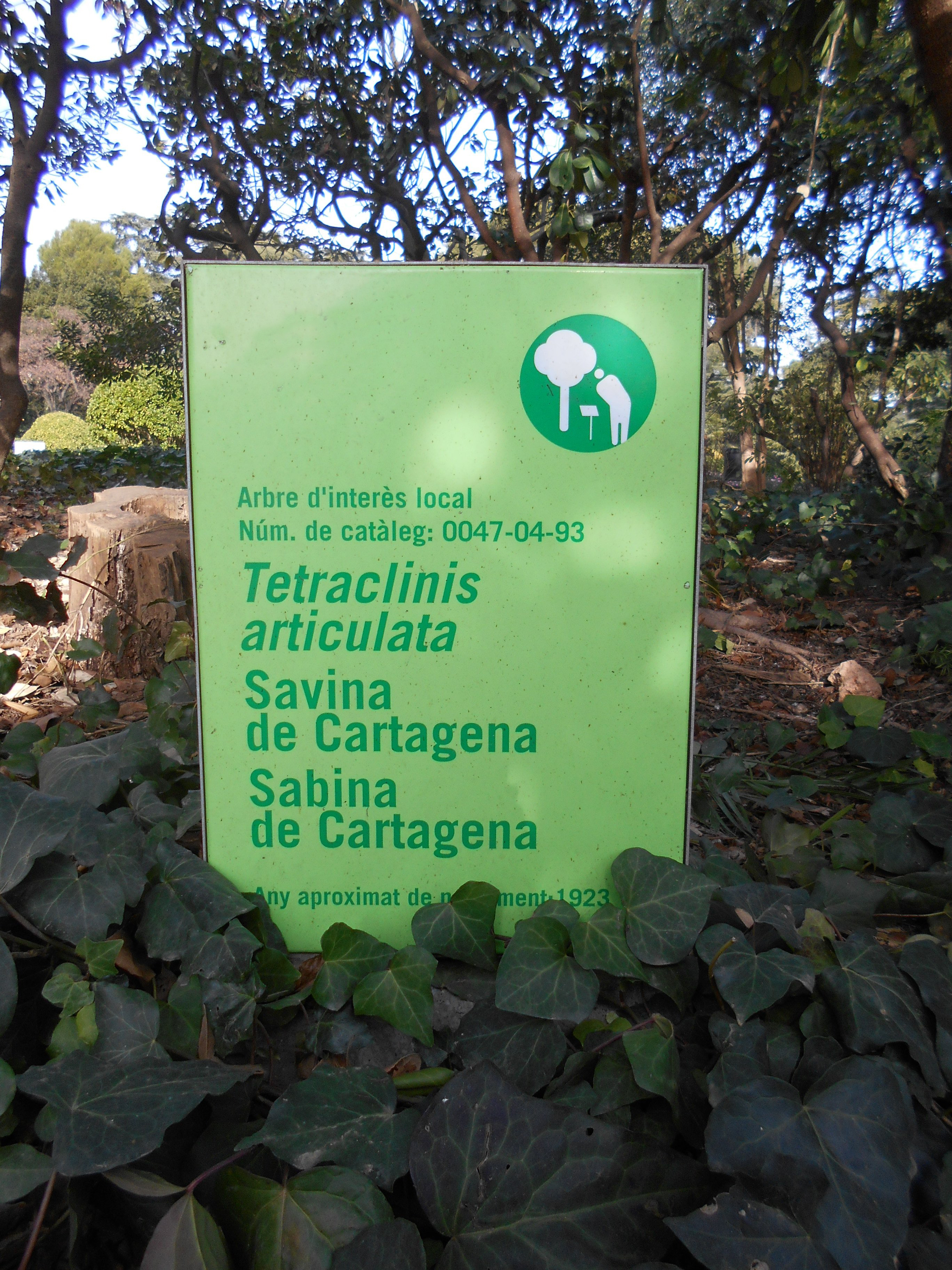
Tree identification sign.

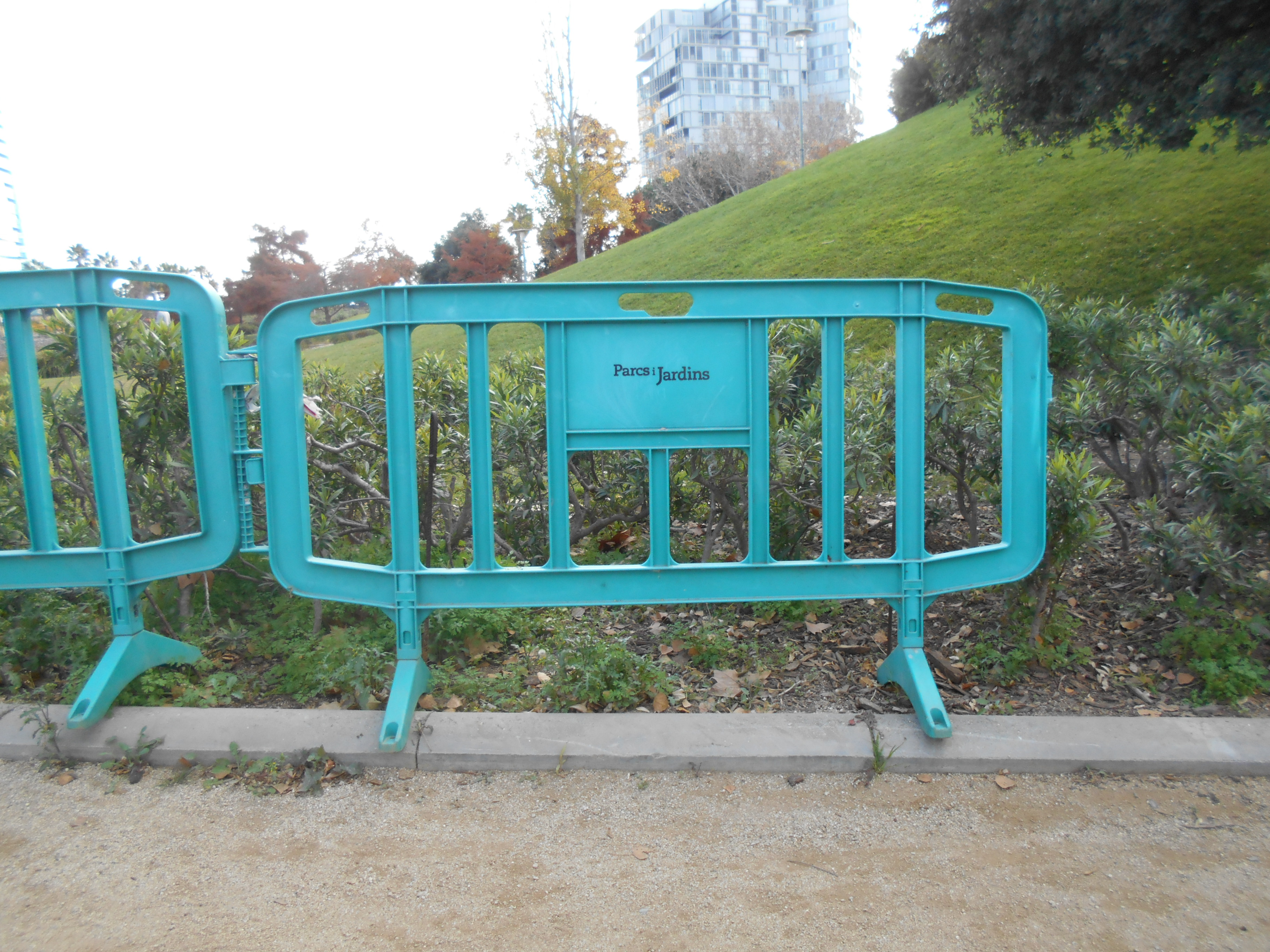
Park and garden fence.

== History ==
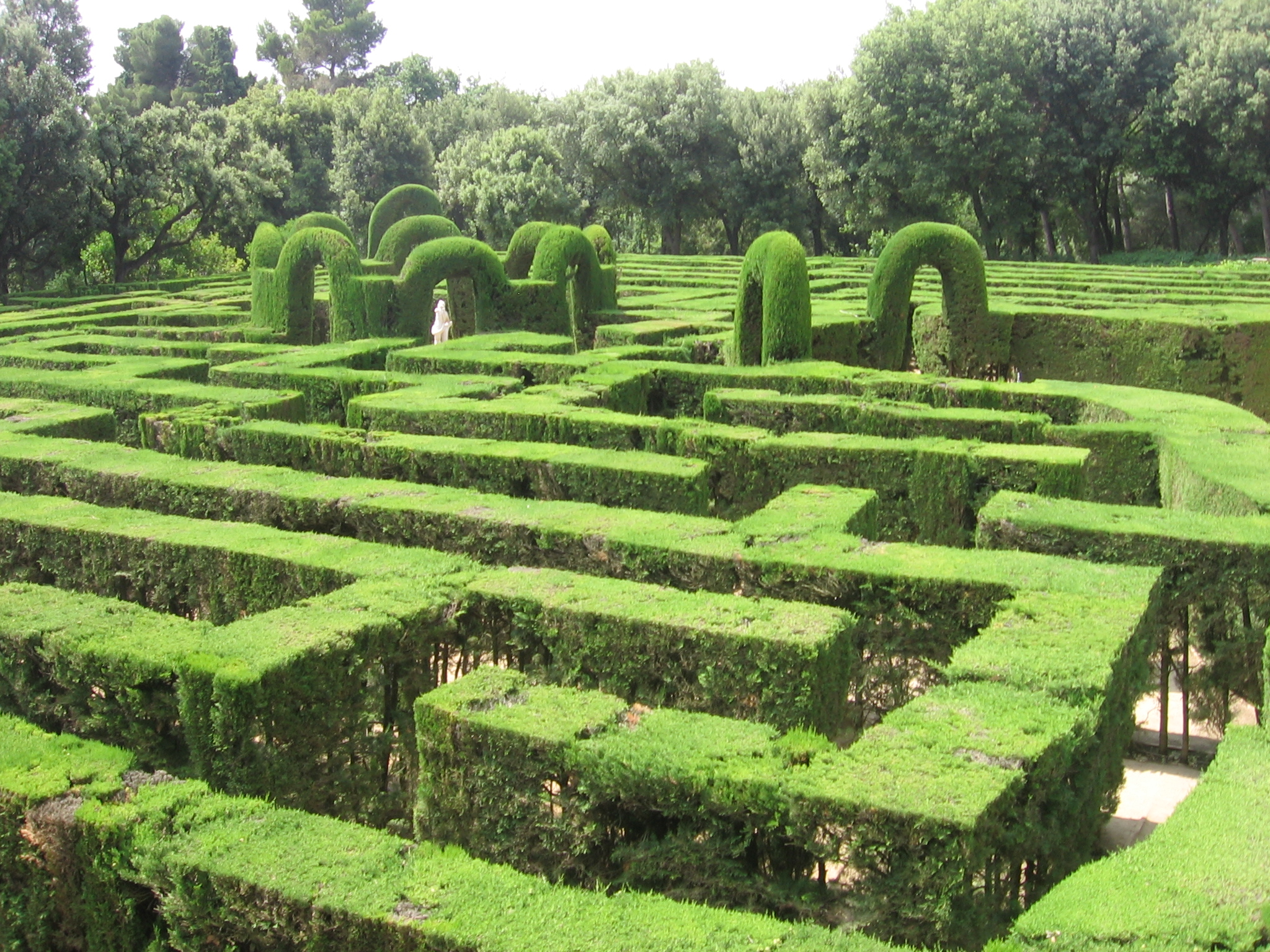
The Labyrinth of Horta Park is the oldest garden preserved in the city.

The first traces of gardening in the city come from the Middle Ages, a period in which the garden was mainly found in monastic enclosures, where a garden and a water well were usually located in the cloister, as well as in castles and palaces, where the secular (or "courtly") garden emerged, of small proportions, generally structured from the orchard, around a fountain or pond, with stone benches to sit on. In some gardens of royal palaces the custom arose of housing animals such as ducks, swans or peacocks, sometimes becoming small zoos that could house more exotic animals, such as lions and leopards, as in the garden of the Queen of the Lesser Royal Palace of Barcelona. From the Gothic period a garden courtyard of the Grand Royal Palace of Barcelona (now the Frederic Marès Museum) is preserved, as well as the Orange Tree Courtyard of the Palace of the Generalitat de Catalunya. The cloister of the Cathedral of Barcelona retains its double bowl fountain in the center, with a Gothic pavilion at one angle, and a garden enclosed by iron railings, with palms, magnolias and other ancient trees, and a pond called Fuente de las Ocas (Fountain of the Gooseberries).

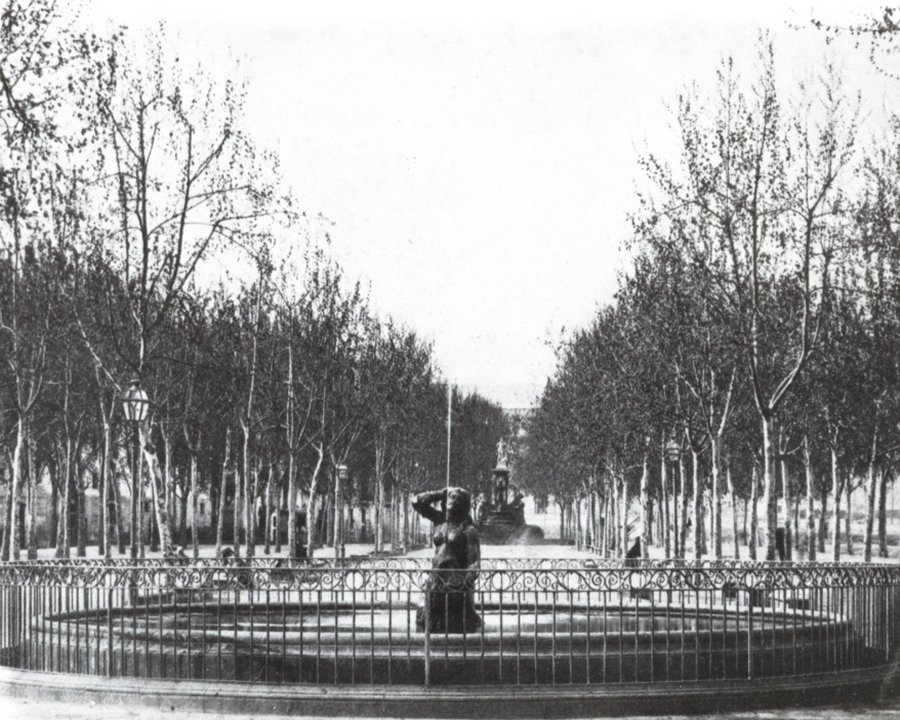
Paseo Nuevo or Paseo de la Explanada, in front of the Citadel, created in 1797 and disappeared before 1888. In the foreground, the fountain of the Nereida, in the background the fountain of Hercules.

However, the first surviving gardens in the city date back to the 18th century. In terms of urban planning, this period saw the opening of promenades in many Spanish cities, inspired by the French boulevard typology, as in the case of La Rambla in Barcelona. But the most outstanding achievement of this period is the Labyrinth Park of Horta, a neoclassical garden created on the initiative of Joan Antoni Desvalls, sixth Marquis of Llupià, and built by the Italian architect Domenico Bagutti and the French gardener Joseph Delvalet between 1794 and 1808.

At the end of the 18th century, the Paseo Nuevo or Paseo de la Explanada was opened next to the military Citadel, a wide avenue lined with poplars and elms and decorated with ornamental fountains —of which the fountain of Hercules is still preserved—. For a time it was the main green space of the city, but it disappeared during the works to prepare the park of the Citadel for the Universal Exposition of 1888.

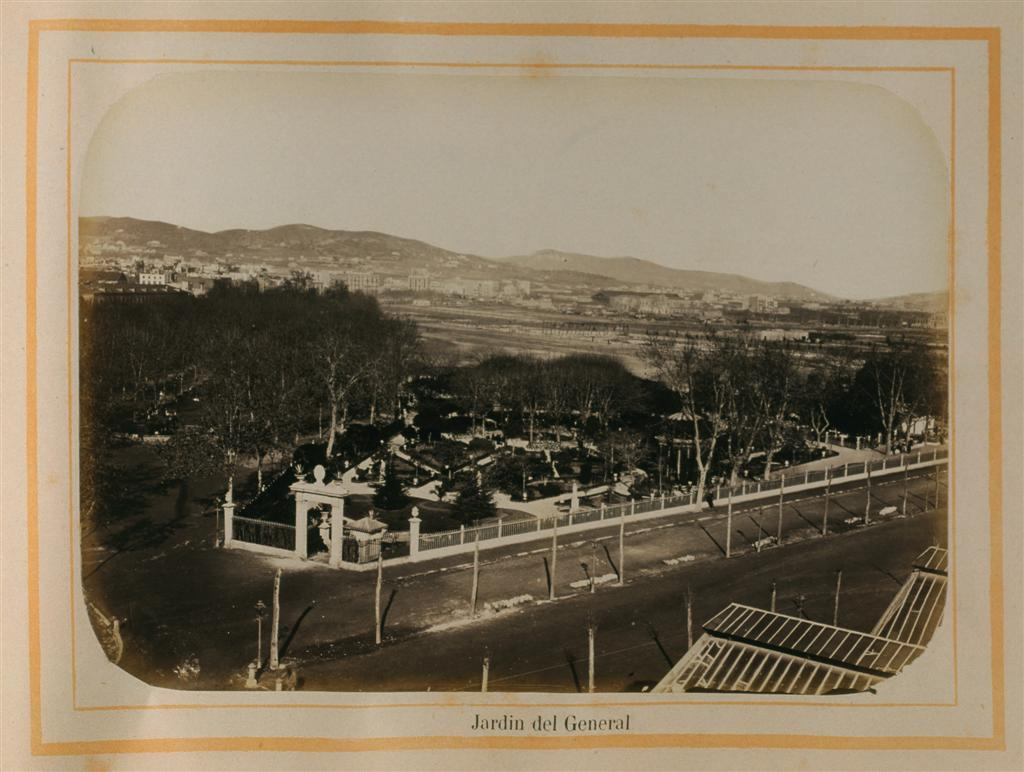
Garden of the General.

The first public parks appeared in the 19th century, due to the phenomenon of the Industrial Revolution, which led to an increase in urban environments, sometimes in conditions of environmental degradation due to poor hygienic conditions and increased pollution by the increasingly abundant industrialization. To alleviate these effects, the creation of large urban gardens and parks was promoted, which were paid for by the public authorities, thus giving rise to a "public gardening" that was gradually differentiated from the private comitencia that until then had monopolized the large gardening projects; this led to the introduction of the concept of landscape architecture, as well as the development of urban planning.

The first public garden in Barcelona was created in 1816: the Garden of the General, an initiative of the Captain General of Catalonia, Francisco Javier Castaños. It was located between the present-day Avinguda Marquès de l'Argentera and the Citadel, in front of where the Estació de França is today, and covered an area of 0.4 hectares. Unfortunately, this space disappeared in 1877.

During the 19th century, the opening of promenades and avenues continued, such as the Passeig de Gràcia, whose works began in 1821 with the planting of acacias, plane trees, poplars, mulberry trees, oleanders and holm oaks. In this promenade were located several gardens, such as the Tívoli gardens, between Valencia and Consejo de Ciento streets, which had a nursery of flowers and aromatic plants; the jardí dels Camps Elisis, between Aragon and Roussillon streets, which had a garden, a lake with boats, a theater and an amusement park with roller coasters; other gardens were the Criadero, Ninfa, Euterpe and Prado Catalán. These gardens disappeared a few years later when Passeig de Gràcia was urbanized.

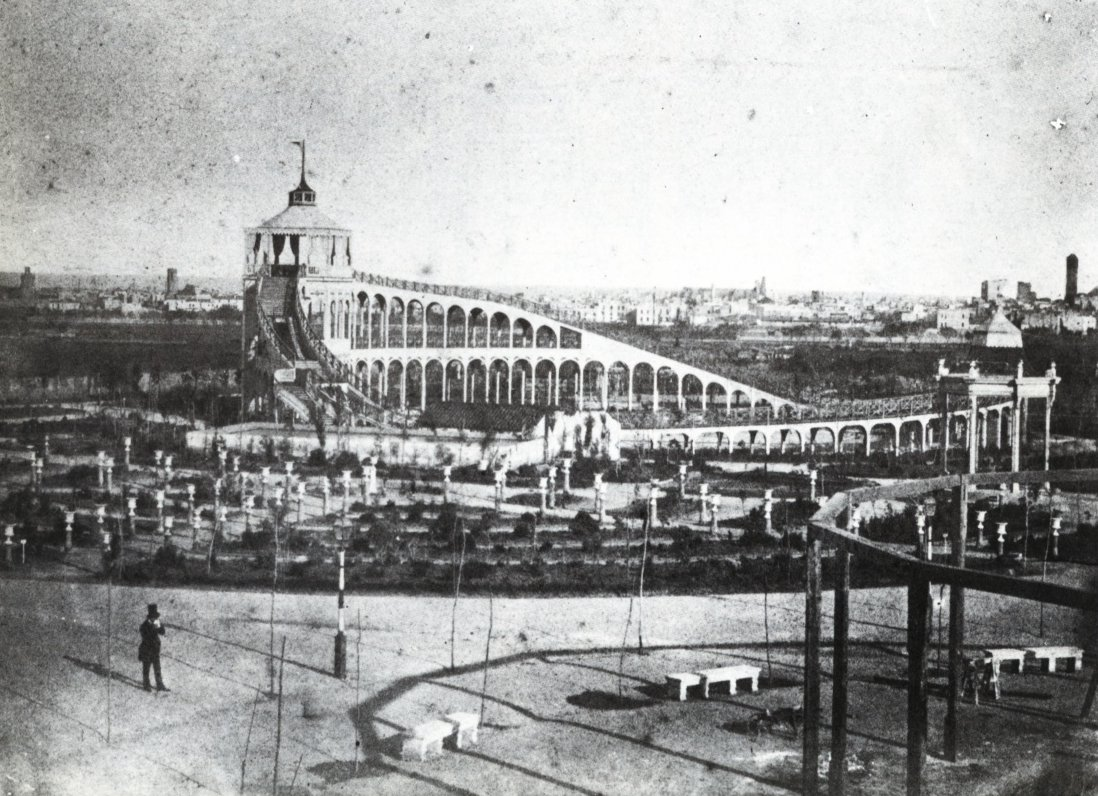
Garden and amusement park of the jardí dels Camps Elisis, Passeig de Gràcia, installed in 1853 and disappeared before 1877.

At that time there were also several projects for the reform and ensanche of cities, which among other factors multiplied the space of green areas for the use and enjoyment of the population, such as the expansion of Barcelona, with a design by Ildefonso Cerdá (1860), which included a green area inside each block of houses, although in most cases it was never built, mainly due to real estate speculation. In 1872, after the demolition of the walls of the fortress of the Citadel, the Barcelona City Council organized a competition to build the first large public park in the city, the Parc de la Ciutadella. The project was commissioned to Josep Fontserè, who designed extensive gardens for the recreation of the citizens, under the slogan "gardens are to cities what lungs are to the human body". Ramón Oliva, director of Barcelona's public gardens since 1874, was in charge of the gardening work. This park would be the main nucleus of the subsequent Universal Exposition of 1888.

Between the 19th and 20th centuries modernism emerged, (Note: Modernism was given different names depending on where it originated: Art Nouveau in France, Modern Style in the United Kingdom, Jugendstil in Germany, Sezession in Austria, Liberty in Italy, etc. (Chilvers, 2007, p. 61.)) a movement that gave special relevance to design and architecture as a global work, both exterior and interior, with an anti-classical language inherited from romanticism, a strong link between architecture and the applied arts, and a markedly ornamental style. Its main exponent was Antoni Gaudí, who in addition to being an architect was also an urban planner and landscape designer, with a personal style based on the observation of nature. Gaudí had a great knowledge of botany and geomorphology, and although he was a great advocate of the use of Mediterranean vegetation, especially the type of sclerophyllous forest typical of the Mediterranean area, such as pines and oaks, he also used allochthonous species such as palms, mimosas and eucalyptus. Many of his projects included gardens, such as the Casa Vicens or the Güell Pavilions, but Gaudí's main garden project was the Parc Güell (1900-1914), commissioned by his patron, Count Eusebi Güell, to build a residential development in the style of the English garden cities, located on the so-called Montaña Pelada, in La Salut district of Barcelona. In 1984 Unesco included Parc Güell in the World Heritage Site "Works of Antoni Gaudí".

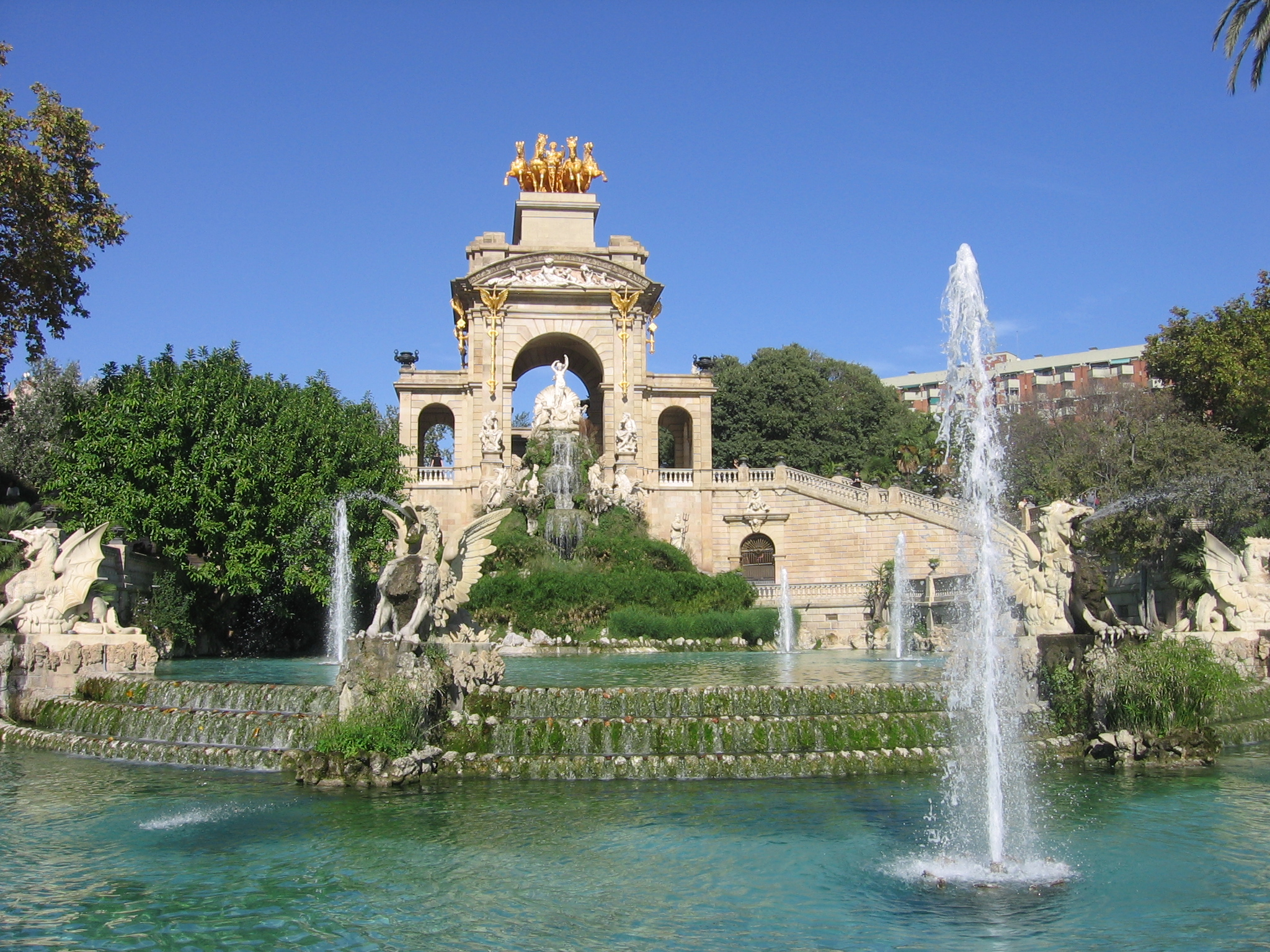
Waterfall of the Parc de la Ciutadella.

With the arrival of the 20th century, the Barcelona City Council organized a competition for a plan of connections between the Eixample and the municipalities recently added to the city, won in 1905 by Léon Jaussely, who designed a plan that foresaw large road infrastructures (promenades, diagonals, promenades), parks, rail links and service areas. Although it was only partially realized, it inspired Barcelona's urban planning for much of the century. In the first decades of the 20th century, thanks to the impulse of a new exhibition, the 1929 International Exposition, the Montjuïc mountain was developed with a project by the French landscape architect Jean-Claude Nicolas Forestier, author of the Maria Luisa park in Seville, where he brought into fashion the so-called "neo-Sevillian style", characterized by the use of brick and tile, and where water and the use of elements such as pergolas and trellises, as well as stairs and terraces to dynamize the grounds, are essential. Forestier was a proponent of the garden as a work of art, and among his premises was the maximum use of local resources, so in his works in Spain he worked essentially with Mediterranean vegetation, although he also introduced some species from South America, where he had worked, such as the tipuana, the jacaranda and the ombú. In Montjuïc he had the collaboration of Nicolau Maria Rubió i Tudurí, architect and landscape designer, with whom he created a complex with a markedly Mediterranean character and classicist taste, centered on the Laribal (1917-1924) and Miramar (1919-1923) gardens. The team formed by Forestier and Rubió left several other works in the city, such as the landscaping of the Plaza de Armas in the Parc de la Ciutadella (1915) and the Parc del Guinardó (1918). On the other hand, the Botanical Garden of Barcelona was established in 1930, located at the bottom of a quarry behind the National Palace of Montjuïc, with a magnificent collection of exotic plants compiled by the botanist Pius Font i Quer.

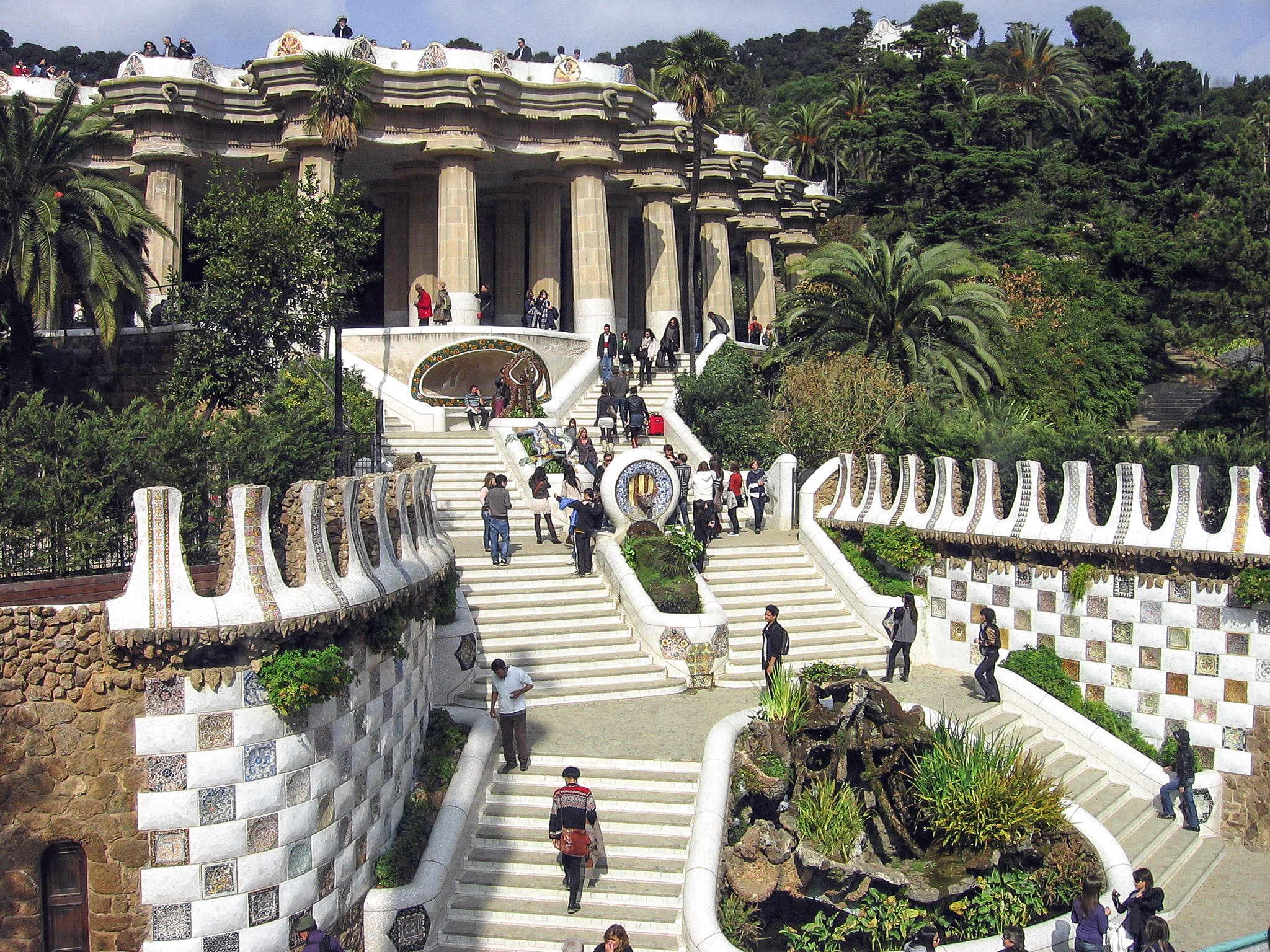
Parc Güell, work of Antoni Gaudí.

Rubió i Tudurí was the leading representative of Noucentisme, a movement for the renovation of culture that sought to bring it closer to the innovations produced in the new 20th century, and which, contrary to the Nordic values defended by modernism, advocated a return to the Mediterranean world, to classical Greco-Latin culture. Director of Parks and Gardens of Barcelona between 1917 and 1937, he was the main promoter of the "Mediterranean garden", which is denoted in his works such as the gardens of the Francesc Macià square (1925), the Font del Racó park (1926), the gardens of the Royal Palace of Pedralbes (1927), those of Turó Park (1933) and those of the Gaudí square, in front of the Sagrada Familia (1981). Rubió i Tudurí founded in 1933 the Municipal School of Apprentice Gardeners, currently the Rubió i Tudurí Municipal Secondary School. In 1926 he proposed with the text El problema de los espacios libres —presented at the XI National Congress of Architects— the placement of a series of green spaces in the form of concentric semicircles between the Besós and Llobregat rivers, all along the Siera de Collserola, with small enclaves in the inner part of the city in the style of the London squares; unfortunately, the project was not executed, except in small portions.

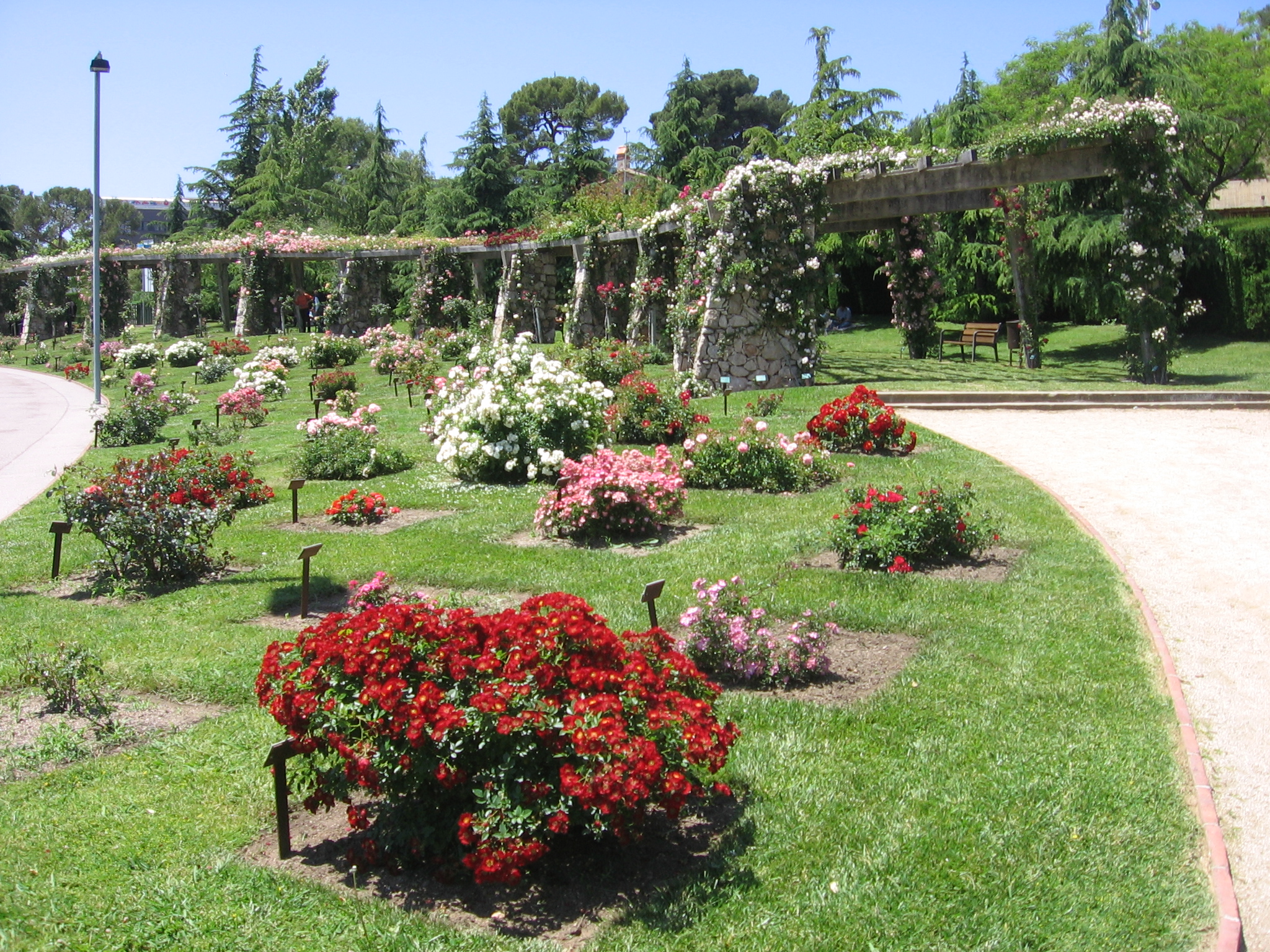
Parc de Cervantes.

The Civil War brought the city's landscaping projects to a halt, and in the post-war period the actions focused more on the maintenance and restoration of existing areas than on the creation of new green zones. In 1940, Lluís Riudor i Carol, the initiator of landscaping in Catalonia, was put in charge of Parks and Gardens. His works included the Austria Garden —located in the Parc Güell area—, the Monterols Park, the Cervantes Park, and several interventions in the Montjuïc mountain aimed at suppressing the shantytowns produced by immigration in the post-war period, This project was continued by his successor, Joaquim Casamor, with the creation of several thematic gardens, such as the Mossèn Costa i Llobera gardens, specialized in cacti and succulents, and the Mossèn Cinto Verdaguer gardens, dedicated to aquatic, bulbous and rhizomatous plants. His work also included the Mirador del Alcalde gardens on Montjuïc and the Joan Maragall gardens, located around the Albeniz Palace, residence of the Spanish royal family during their visits to Barcelona, in neoclassical style; and, in the rest of Barcelona, the Putget, Guineueta and Villa Amelia parks. During this period, the Barcelona City Council also purchased several private properties that were incorporated into the public parks, such as the Horta Labyrinth Park (1971), the Castell de l'Oreneta Park (1978) and the Aigües Park (1978).

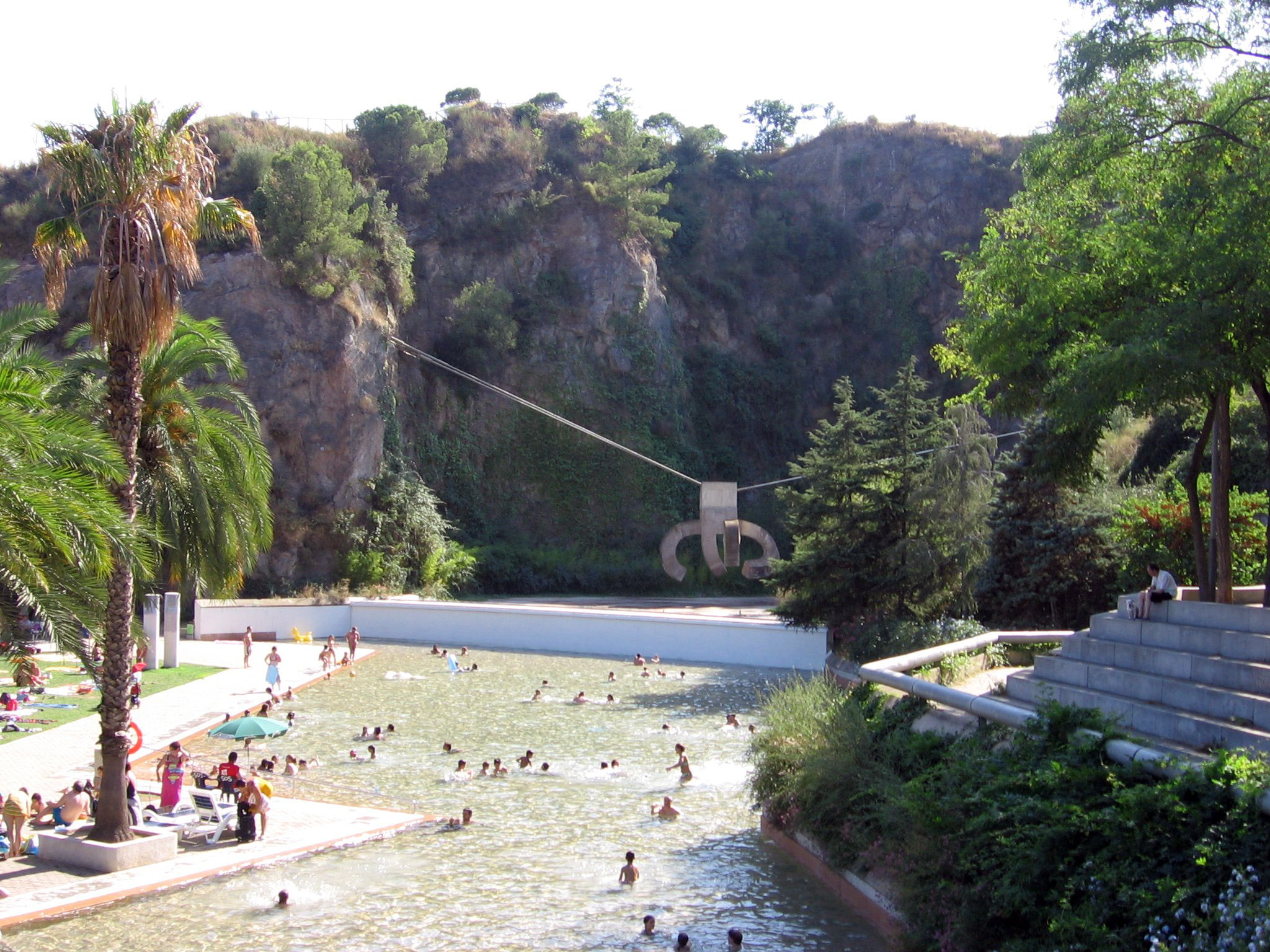
Creueta del Coll park, in the background the sculpture Elogio del agua (1987), by Eduardo Chillida.

The arrival of democracy favored the creation of new green areas in the city. At this time, gardening was closely linked to urban planning, with a concept that combined aesthetics with functionality, as well as recreational aspects, sports facilities, services for certain groups such as children —children's playgrounds— or the elderly —pétanque courts as the most recurrent element—, or even the commercial vision —food and beverage establishments—. In this sense, green areas were usually subordinated to the architectural layout of the complex, losing to a large extent the naturalness of the vegetation, which on many occasions had a certain artificial appearance. In relation to this, perennial and static species such as conifers gained preponderance and were used on a massive scale in the new urban parks. At that time numerous parks were converted from former municipal facilities, such as the Joan Miró park, built in 1983 on the site of the former central slaughterhouse of Barcelona, or in industrial areas (España Industrial park, 1985; Pegaso park, 1986; Clot park, 1986) or from former railway facilities (Sant Martí park, 1985; Estación del Norte park, 1988). As in the previous period, several private properties were acquired, such as the gardens of Villa Cecilia (1986) and the gardens of Ca n'Altimira (1991).

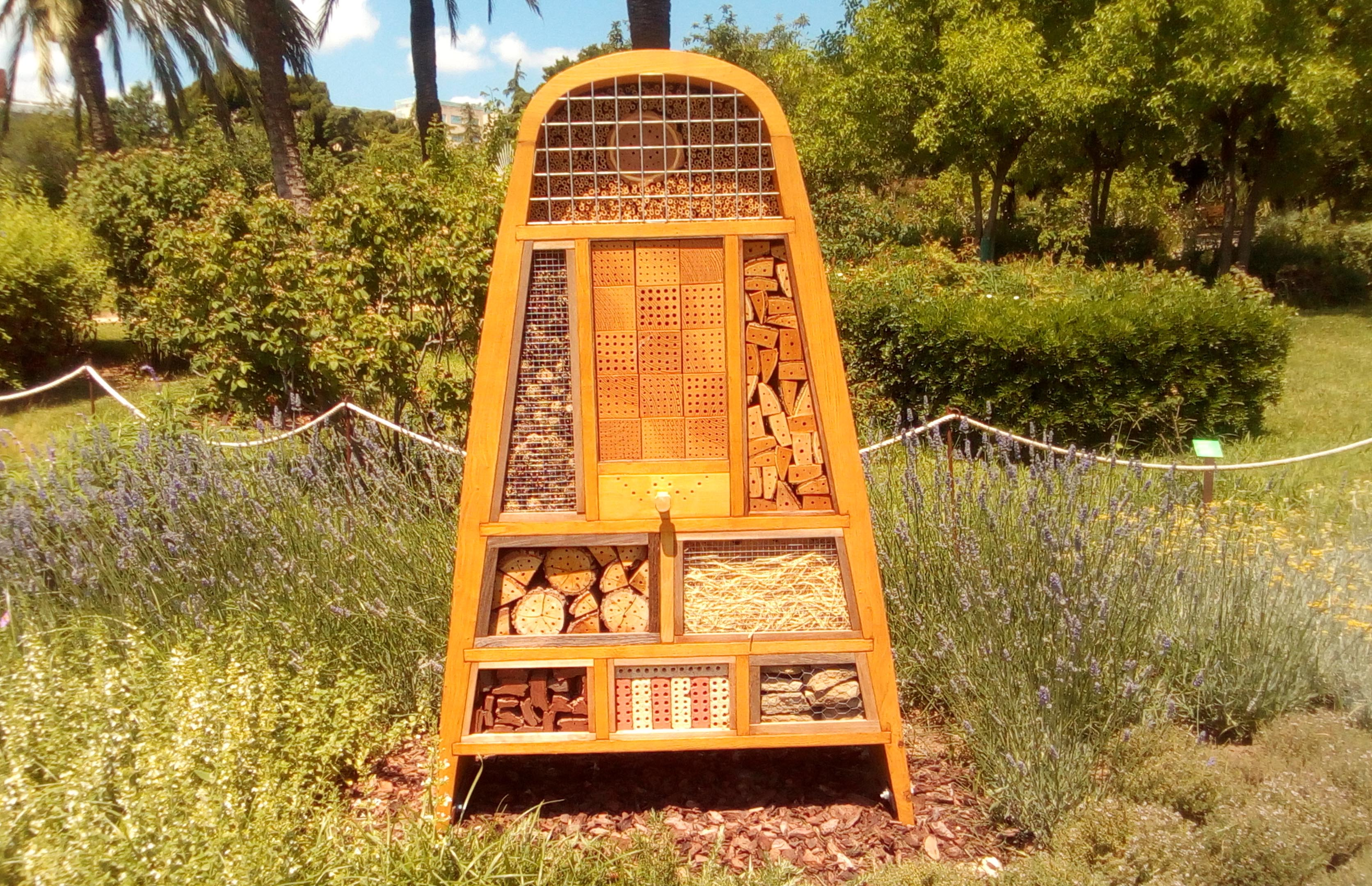
Hotel of bees and wasps, Cervantes Park.

In the 1990s, the predisposition to a greater contact with nature returned, and there was a growing awareness of the damage done to the environment. Since then, the defense of nature and ecological values has been increasing in society, which has resulted in greater efforts to conserve the natural heritage and in the design of new gardens with greater relevance of vegetation and its location in the environment. Barcelona has been a clear example in this sense, since, especially thanks to the impulse of the 1992 Olympic Games, it initiated a process of restoration and conservation of its parks and gardens, while at the same time new ones were created with a more naturalistic design, such as the Creueta del Coll park, in addition to the actions on the seafront and in the new neighborhood of the Olympic Village. On Montjuïc, the epicenter of the Games, a new 14-hectare Botanical Garden was installed, dedicated to Mediterranean plants from all over the world, the work of Carlos Ferrater and Bet Figueras, and the Sculpture Garden was established next to the Miró Foundation, with works by sculptors such as Tom Carr, Pep Durán, Perejaume, Enric Pladevall, Jaume Plensa, Josep Maria Riera i Aragó, Erna Verlinden and Sergi Aguilar. In 2003 the Joan Brossa gardens were inaugurated, located on the land formerly occupied by the Montjuïc Amusement Park, with a remodeling carried out by Patrizia Falcone in landscape style. Other playgrounds were the Mirador del Migdia, Poblenou, Carlos I and Valle de Hebron parks.

In the 21st century there was a new boost to gardening with the celebration of the Universal Forum of Cultures 2004 in the Diagonal Mar area, which left a new green area of 214 hectares, with gardens such as the Garcia Fària Linear Park, the Forum Park and the Diagonal Mar Park. In the second decade of the century, the construction of two large parks is planned, which will significantly increase the green space of the city: the Glories Park and the Sagrera Park.

During Ada Colau's mayoralty, a program of naturalization and ecological management of the city's green spaces was promoted, with the aim of increasing the green surface area and promoting biodiversity. Among other actions, vegetation was increased, native species were protected, trees were pruned less frequently and plants were allowed to grow in the tree wells. The goal was to increase green spaces by 160 hectares by 2030, with a target of 1 m^{2} per person. In addition to increasing green spaces, 80 insect facilities and more than 260 bird nests were installed. The use of chemical herbicides was also eliminated and phytosanitary treatments were reduced.

== Self-managed parks and gardens ==
Several self-managed parks exist throughout the municipality of Barcelona. These spaces are normally run by the community and are sometimes occupied, such as Agora Juan Andres in Raval or L'Horta Alliberada in Sants.

In certain cases, the Barcelona city hall cedes these parks or gardens to the communities who run them, to promote activities related to urban agriculture, nature studies and biodiversity preservation. There have been also situations in which, the government has evicted or threatened with eviction such spaces.

== See also ==
- List of parks and gardens of Barcelona
- Gardening in Spain
- Catalan art
- Fountains of Barcelona
- Architecture of Barcelona
- Public art in Barcelona

== Bibliography ==
- AA.VV. (1996). Enciclopèdia Catalana Bàsica (in Catalan). Barcelona: Enciclopèdia Catalana.
- AA.VV. (2001). Gaudí. Hàbitat, natura i cosmos (in Catalan). Barcelona: Lunwerg. ISBN 84-7782-799-0.
- AA.VV. (II) (2001). Memòria 2001. Parcs i Jardins de Barcelona, Institut Municipal (in Catalan). Ayuntamiento de Barcelona.
- Añón Feliú, Carmen; Luengo, Mónica (2003). Jardines de España (in Spanish). Madrid: Lunwerg. ISBN 84-9785-006-8.
- Azcárate Ristori, José María de; Pérez Sánchez, Alfonso Emilio; Ramírez Domínguez, Juan Antonio (1983). Historia del Arte (in Spanish). Madrid: Anaya. ISBN 84-207-1408-9.
- Bassegoda i Nonell, Joan (2002). Gaudí o espacio, luz y equilibrio (in Spanish). Madrid: Criterio. ISBN 84-95437-10-4.
- Buttlar, Adrian von; Soto Caba, Victoria (1993). Jardines del clasicismo y el romanticismo. El jardín paisajista (in Spanish). Madrid: Nerea. ISBN 84-86763-76-2.
- Chilvers, Ian (2007). Diccionario de arte (in Spanish). Madrid: Alianza Editorial. ISBN 978-84-206-6170-4.
- Fernández Arenas, José (1988). Arte efímero y espacio estético (in Spanish). Barcelona: Anthropos. ISBN 84-7658-078-9.
- Gabancho, Patrícia (2000). Guía. Parques y jardines de Barcelona (in Spanish). Barcelona: Ajuntament de Barcelona, Imatge i Producció Editorial. ISBN 84-7609-935-5.
- Garrut, Josep Maria (1976). L'Exposició Universal de Barcelona de 1888 (in Catalan). Barcelona: Ajuntament de Barcelona, Delegació de Cultura. ISBN 84-500-1498-0.
- Kluckert, Ehrenfried (2007). Grandes jardines de Europa (in Spanish). Colonia: Ullmann. ISBN 978-3-8331-6225-1.
- Mirecki, Guillermo; García Reviejo, Luis (2002). Por los parques y jardines de Barcelona (in Spanish). Madrid: Desnivel. ISBN 84-95760-39-8.
- Páez de la Cadena, Francisco (1998). Historia de los estilos en jardinería (in Spanish). Madrid: Istmo. ISBN 84-7090-127-3.
- Vidal Pla, Miquel (2003). Jardins de Barcelona (in Catalan). Barcelona: Àmbit. ISBN 84-89681-77-5.
- Villoro, Joan; Riudor, Lluís (1984). Guia dels espais verds de Barcelona. Aproximació històrica (in Catalan). Barcelona: La Gaia Ciència. ISBN 84-7080-207-0.
