= Jardín de los Campos Elíseos =

Demolished amusement park in Barcelona

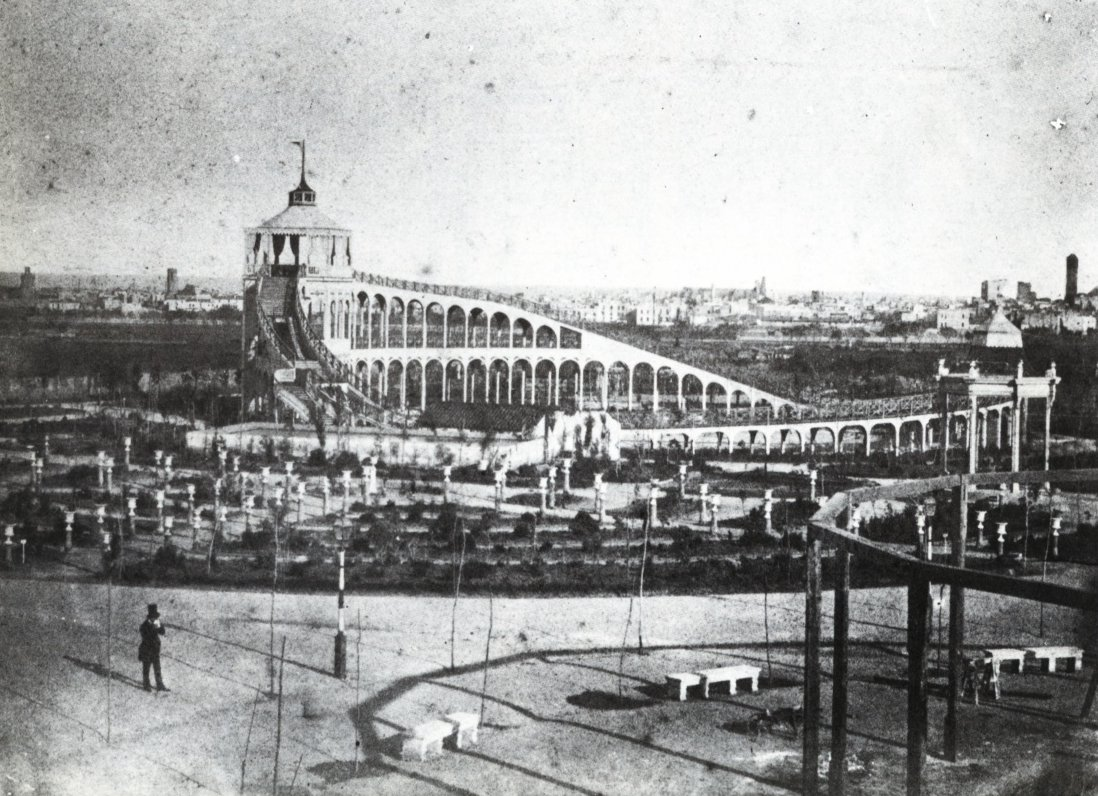
Jardín de los Campos Elisis in 1854, roller coaster pictured in the back (taken by F. Gobinet de Villecholes).

The Jardí dels Camps Elisis (in Spanish: Jardín de los Campos Elíseos) was a garden and amusement park located on the Passeig de Gràcia, in Barcelona. Inaugurated in 1853, in its time it was the main leisure center for the people of Barcelona, where parties and shows were held in addition to the attractions of the park. It shut down in 1875 due to the decline of its success and the increase in building on Passeig de Gràcia, which had been revalued with the Eixample project, where strong real estate speculation had arisen. The project was the work of Josep Oriol Mestres, and belonged to José de Salamanca.

== History ==
Passeig de Gràcia was once known as Camí de Jesús, an old rural road that led from Barcelona to the Vila de Gràcia. This was a rural area until the creation of the avenue in 1821 when a landscaped promenade was created in the style of the French boulevards, planted with acacias, plane trees, poplars, mulberry trees, oleanders, and holm oaks. Until its construction from the Ildefons Cerdà's Eixample project, it was a place of recreation and leisure, destined for the relaxation of the citizens. In the middle of the 19th century, several parks and gardens were installed in the area, most of them ephemeral, such as the Criadero gardens, located between Gran Via de les Corts Catalanes and Diputació street, created in 1840, which were replaced by the Delicias garden in 1863, which in turn gave way to the Gran Teatre Espanyol in 1870; the Tívoli gardens, created in 1848 between Rambla de Catalunya, València street and Consell de Cent street, on whose site the Tívoli Theater was built; the Euterpe gardens, between València and Mallorca streets, inaugurated in 1857 and shut down in 1862; the Nimfa garden, created in 1854 and shut down in 1862 and located between Tívoli and Euterpe, were until 2005 the Cine Publi stood; and the Prado Catalán gardens, located in the section between Gran Via, Casp and Pau Claris streets, created in 1863, which lasted until 1877.

Of all of them, the largest and most successful was the Jardí dels Camps Elisis, created in 1853 and shut down in 1875, owned by José de Salamanca, 1st Marquis of Salamanca, an aristocrat, statesman, and businessman. It was located between Passeig de Gràcia and the streets Aragó, Rosselló and Roger de Llúria, and had an area of 8 ha -the equivalent of 8 blocks of the Eixample - and 350 m of promenade. Inaugurated on April 10, 1853, the author of the project was the architect Josep Oriol Mestres, assisted by the decorator Fèlix Cagé.

Conceived as an amusement park, it was the first to charge admission. It had a lake with boats, a labyrinth, a theater, a restaurant, a circus, an equestrian ring, cue sports, a carousel, pistol and crossbow shooting attractions, and roller coasters, as well as the so-called Swiss Cabins, which had a toy store, a dairy, and a confectionery. The theater, also called the Camps Elisis, operated from 1860 to 1876 and was replaced by the Lyric Theater-Beethoven Hall.

The decoration was based on French aesthetics, and highlighted by a “Venetian” lighting, formed by lights hanging from the trees and by luminous gas balloons that spread light throughout the rest of the park. For this reason, the night parties, which included music, dance, theater, and pyrotechnic shows, were very successful.

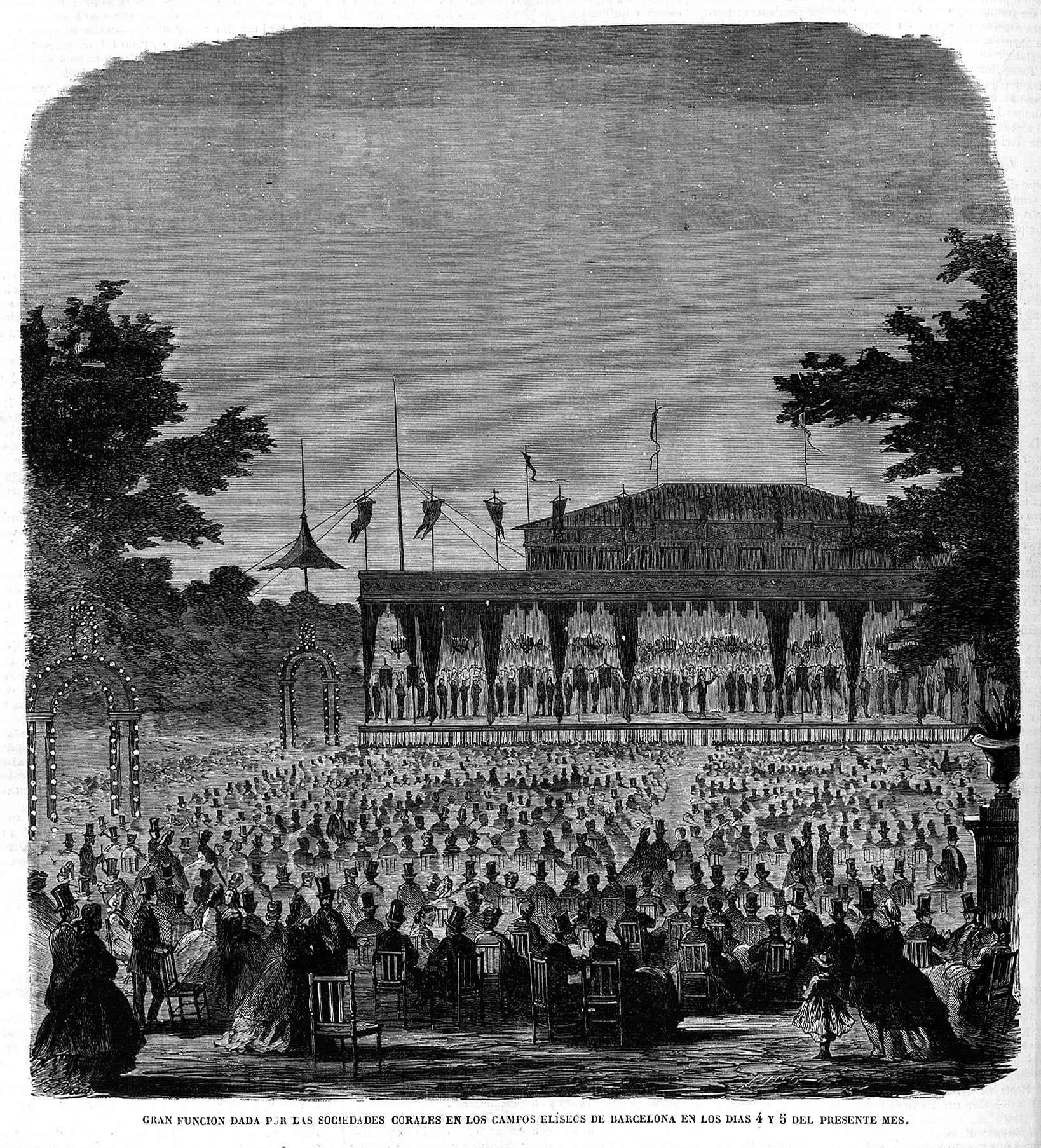
Great performance given by the choral societies on Jardín de los Campos Elisis in Barcelona (El Museo Universal, June 1864).

The period of maximum splendor of the park was between 1858 and 1868, a decade in which large theatrical shows were held, which could accommodate around 1,000 spectators. The performances included comic operettas, opera buffas, zarzuelas, and vaudevilles, as well as magic shows. Among the various premieres were: Tannhäuser, by Richard Wagner (1862); Pipete o il portinajo di Panigi (in English: Pipete, or the Porter of Panigi), by Serafin de Ferrari (1864); Il Caid, by Ambrosi Thomàs (1865); and Ernani, by Giuseppe Verdi (1867). There were also performances of choral songs by José Anselmo Clavé.

Another of the most successful shows was the fireworks, especially those designed by the scenographer Fèlix Cagé, of which the most remembered was a reproduction of the eruption of Vesuvius in 1862, which included a crater with torrents of lava and columns of smoke, accompanied by aerial fireworks and loud detonations. There were also aerostatic exhibitions, such as those carried out in 1855 by the French company Buislay. Likewise, fairs and exhibitions used to be held, such as the agricultural ones organized by the Institut Agrícola Català de Sant Isidre in 1872 and 1873.

As for the theater, it was one of the main centers of consecration of Catalan plays and actors. Among the various premieres were: Els de fora y els de dins (in English: Those Outside and Those Inside), by Francesc Soler i Vidal; and A boca tancada (in English: The Closed Mouth), by Eduard Vidal i de Valenciano.

It is worth noting that the park was visited by Queen Isabella II in September of 1870.

Today, nothing remains of the park, and its memory endures only in the name of a street, the passage of the Camps Elisis, which runs in the sea-mountain direction inside the block between the streets Valeècia, Mallorca, Pau Claris, and Passeig de Gràcia.

== See also ==
- History of Barcelona
- Parks and gardens of Barcelona
- Urban planning of Barcelona
- Saturno Park

== Bibliography ==
- Villoro, Joan; Riudor, Lluís (1984). Guia dels espais verds de Barcelona. Aproximació històrica [Guide to the green spaces of Barcelona. Historical approach] (in Catalan). Barcelona: La Gaia Ciència. ISBN 84-7080-207-0.
- Alberch i Fugueras (Dir.), Ramon; Giralt i Radigales (Dir.), Jesús (1999). Els Barris de Barcelona I. Ciutat Vella, L'Eixample [The Neighborhoods of Barcelona I. Old Town, Eixample] (in Catalan). Barcelona: Gran Enciclopèdia Catalana. ISBN 84-412-2768-3.
- Guardia, M. (2006). Enciclopèdia de Barcelona 1. 22@ / Ciutat Meridiana [Encyclopedia of Barcelona 1. 22@ / Ciutat Meridiana] (in Catalan). Barcelona: Gran Enciclopèdia Catalana. ISBN 84-412-1395-X.
- Permanyer, Lluís (1994). Biografia del Passeig de Gràcia [The Passeig de Gràcia Biography] (in Catalan). Barcelona: La Campana. ISBN 978-8486491918.
