= Serra de Collserola =

Mountain in Catalonia, Spain

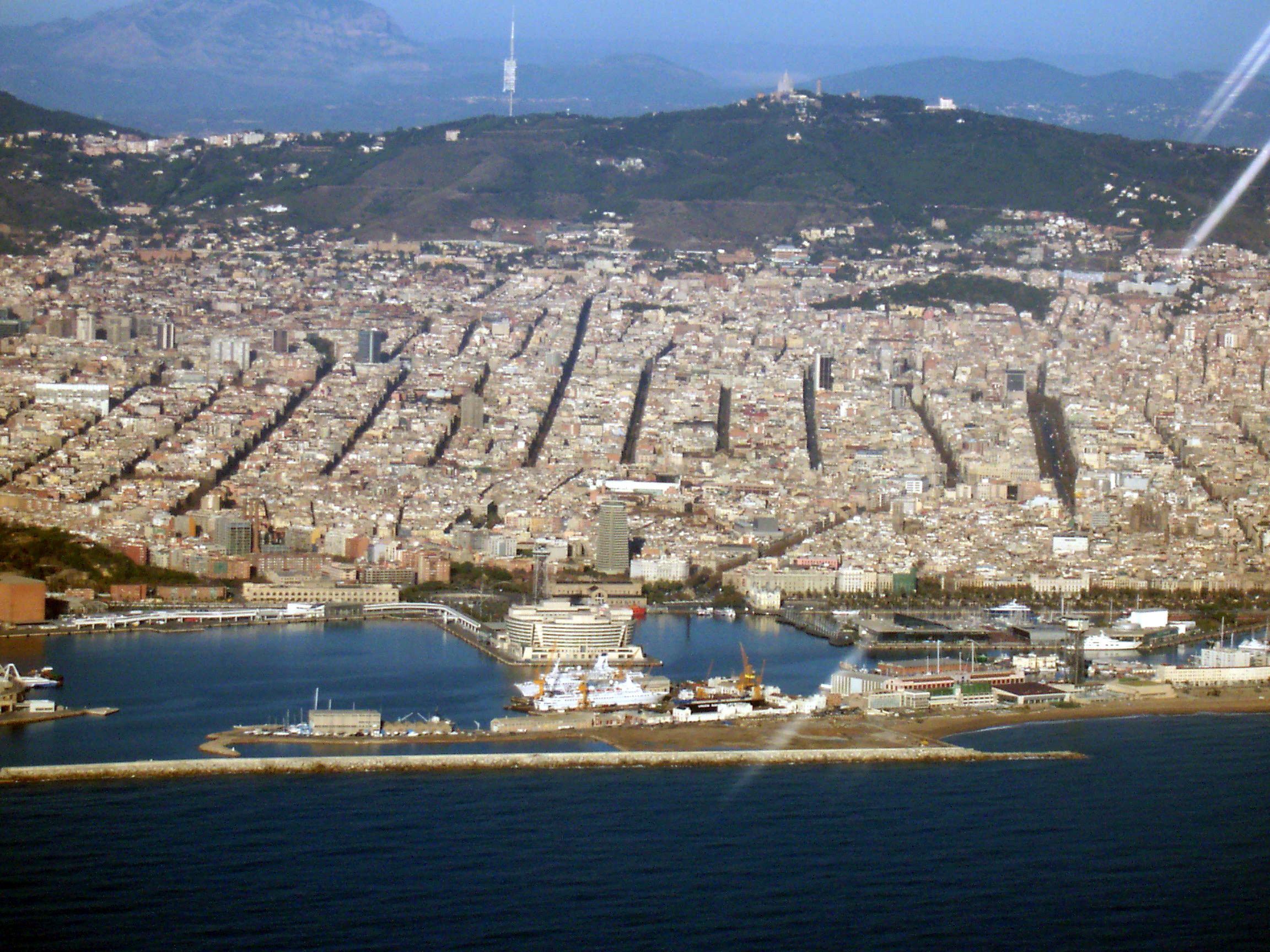
- The Collserola range rising above Barcelona

Highest point
- Elevation: 516.2 m (1,694 ft)
- Coordinates: 41°24′44″N 2°04′26″E

Geography
- Location within Catalonia
- Location: Barcelonès (Catalonia)
- Parent range: Catalan Coastal Range

Geology
- Mountain type: Metamorphic rock

The Serra de Collserola (Catalan pronunciation: [ˈsɛrə ðə ˌkɔʎsəˈɾɔlə]), or simply Collserola, is a mountain range between the rivers Besòs and Llobregat. It is part of the Catalan Coastal Range.

These mountains separate Barcelona from the Vallès plain and their tallest peak is the Tibidabo, at 512 m. Other main summits are: Turó del Puig, Puig d'Olorda, Turó de Valldaura, Turó de la Magarola, Puig d'Ossa, and Puig Madrona. The valleys of the Llobregat and Besós Rivers, the plain of Barcelona, and the Vallès basin, mark the geographical boundaries of the Collserola massif.

== Collserola Park ==
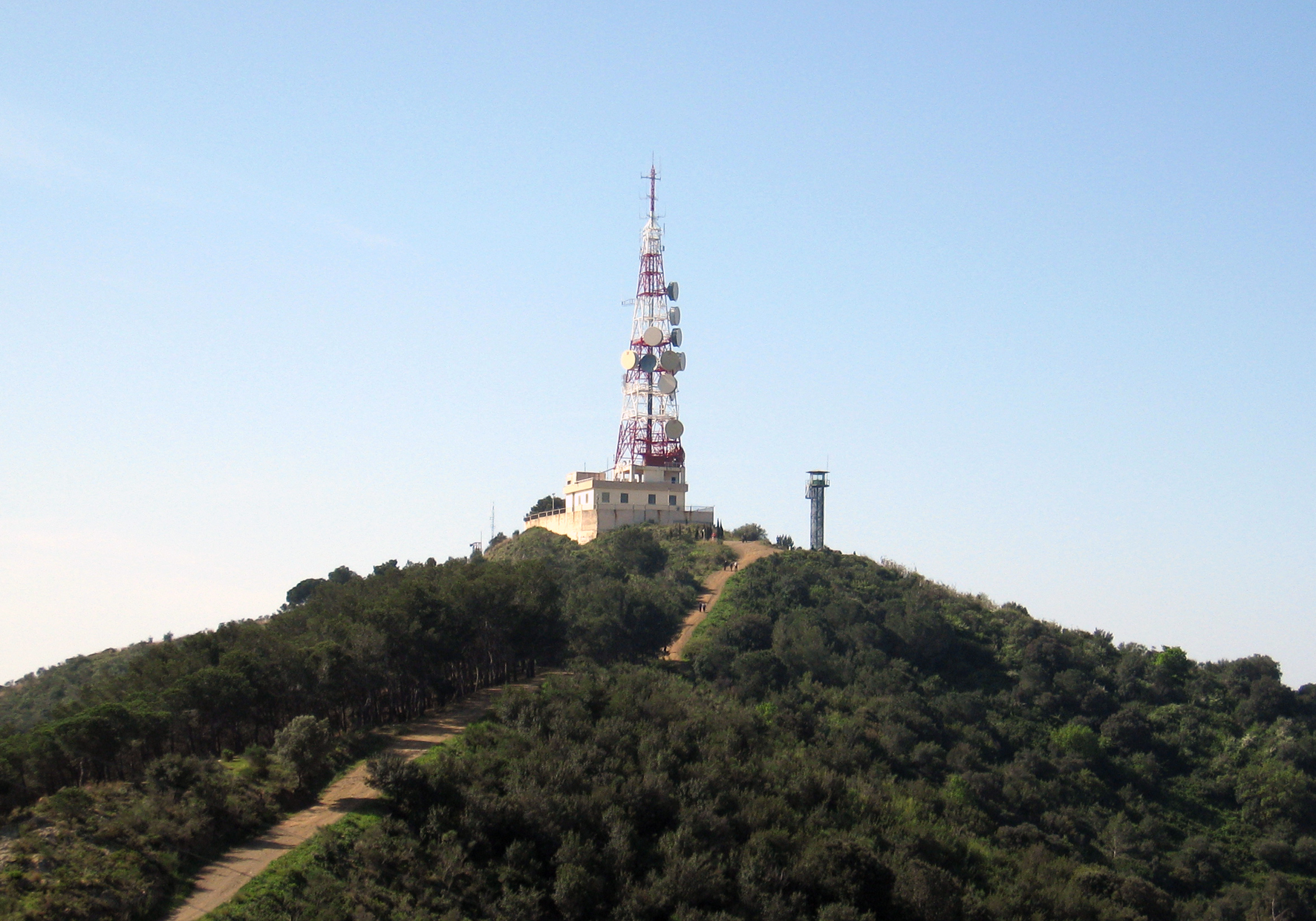
Puig d'Ossa or Sant Pere Màrtir mountain in the Serra de Collserola

To preserve the area, in 1987 the Parc de Collserola (Collserola Park), which has an area of 84.65 km^{2}, was established. It is one of the largest metropolitan parks in the world - 8 times larger than the Bois de Boulogne in Paris, and 22 times larger than Central Park in New York.

In the park, over a thousand major plants and around thirty plant communities have been catalogued, including forests of Aleppo pines and nut pines, evergreen oaklands, riverside copses, maquis and scrublands, brush, and savannah grasslands. This diversity allows for the existence of a rich, varied wildlife; including wild boar, fox, genet, stone marten, badger, rabbit, and squirrel; blue tits, whitethroats, treecreepers, woodpeckers, bee eaters, doves, goshawks, sparrowhawk, and rat-catching eagles; salamanders, newts, green tree frog, the small southern frog, toads, the small spotted toad, the Mediterranean turtle, the giant turtle, the ocellated lizard, and snakes.

On the Vilana hill, of 445 m, stands the Torre de Collserola (Collserola Tower), a telecommunications tower built in 1992 for the use of Olympic games. It is 288.4 m and was built by the British architect Sir Norman Foster.

The Collserola Park is used extensively by the inhabitants of Barcelona and the other towns that border it. It is popular for walking, cycling and birdwatching. There are numerous restaurants where families go during the weekends. A path that follows the ridge of the Serra, known as the "Carretera de les Aigües" (Water Road), has been extensively improved for cyclists. The Barcelona city plan intends to include it in a cycle track that completely circles the city.
