= Parc de Cervantes =

Park in Catalonia, Spain

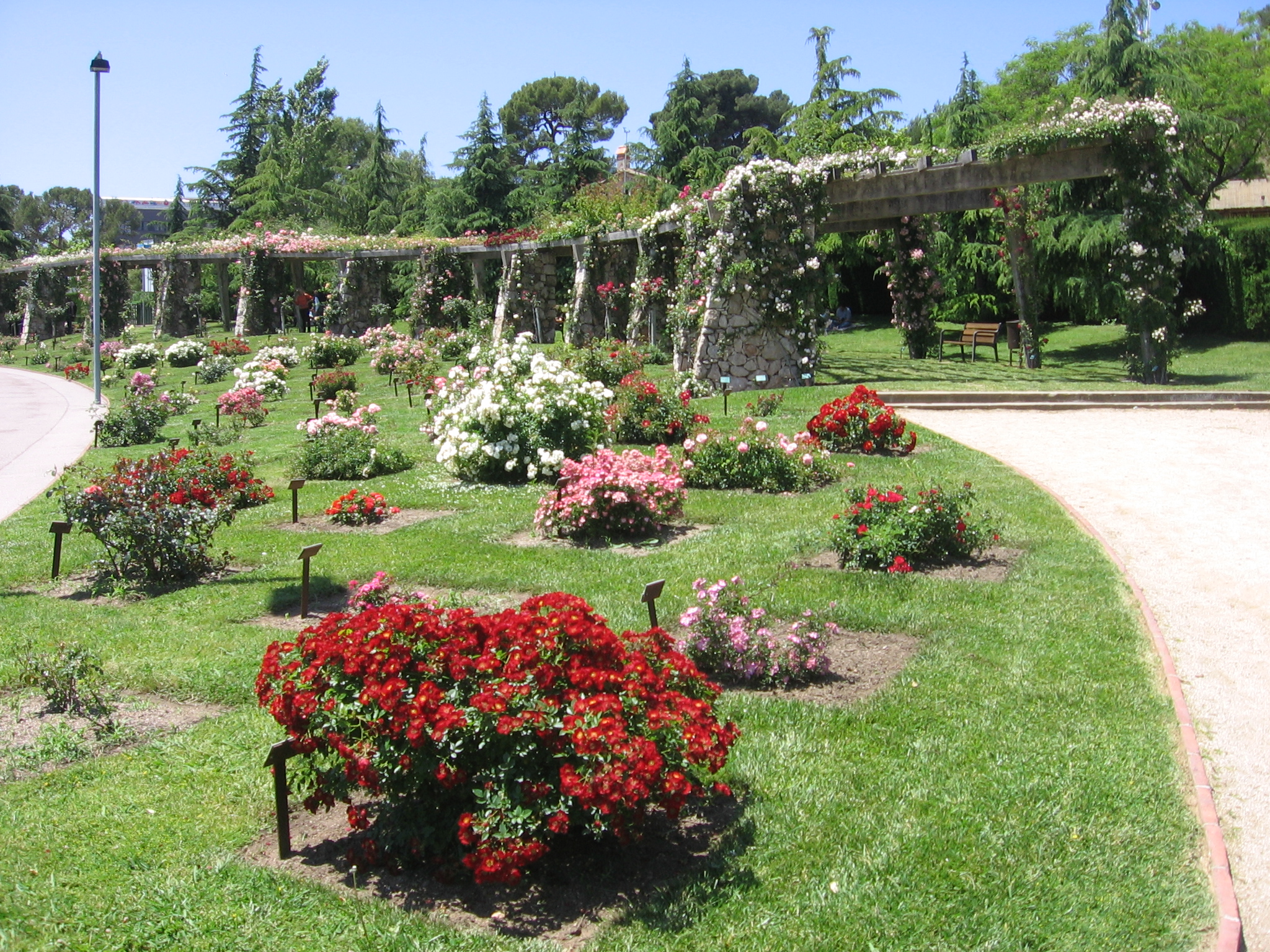
- Partial view of the rose garden in Cervantes Park.

- Location within Barcelona
- Location: Barcelona, Catalonia, Spain
- Coordinates: 41°24′49″N 2°09′10″E
- Area: 87,665 m².
- Established: 1965
- Operator: City Council of Barcelona

The Parc de Cervantes (in Spanish: Parque de Cervantes) is located in the Pedralbes neighborhood, belonging to the Les Corts district, in Barcelona, Catalonia, Spain. It is located between Avinguda Diagonal and Avinguda de Esplugues (in a section that corresponds to Ronda de Dalt), right on the border with the municipality of Esplugas de Llobregat. Opened in 1965, it specializes in rosebushes. It has an area of 87,665 m^{2}.

== Public art ==
Inside the park there are several sculptures and commemorative plaques:

- Rombos gemelos: sculpture by Andreu Alfaro made in 1977.
- Serenidad: sculpture by Eulàlia Fàbregas de Sentmenat, work in white marble from 1964.
- Adán: sculpture by Jacinto Bustos Vasallo, made of artificial stone and brass plate in 1968.
- Barcelona a Cervantes: commemorative plaque designed by Carme Hosta, executed in Montjuïc stone.
- A Concha Espina: commemorative plaque by the sculptor Juan Díaz de la Campa, made in 1969.
- A Ángel Ganivet: commemorative plaque made by Jaume Monràs in 1965.
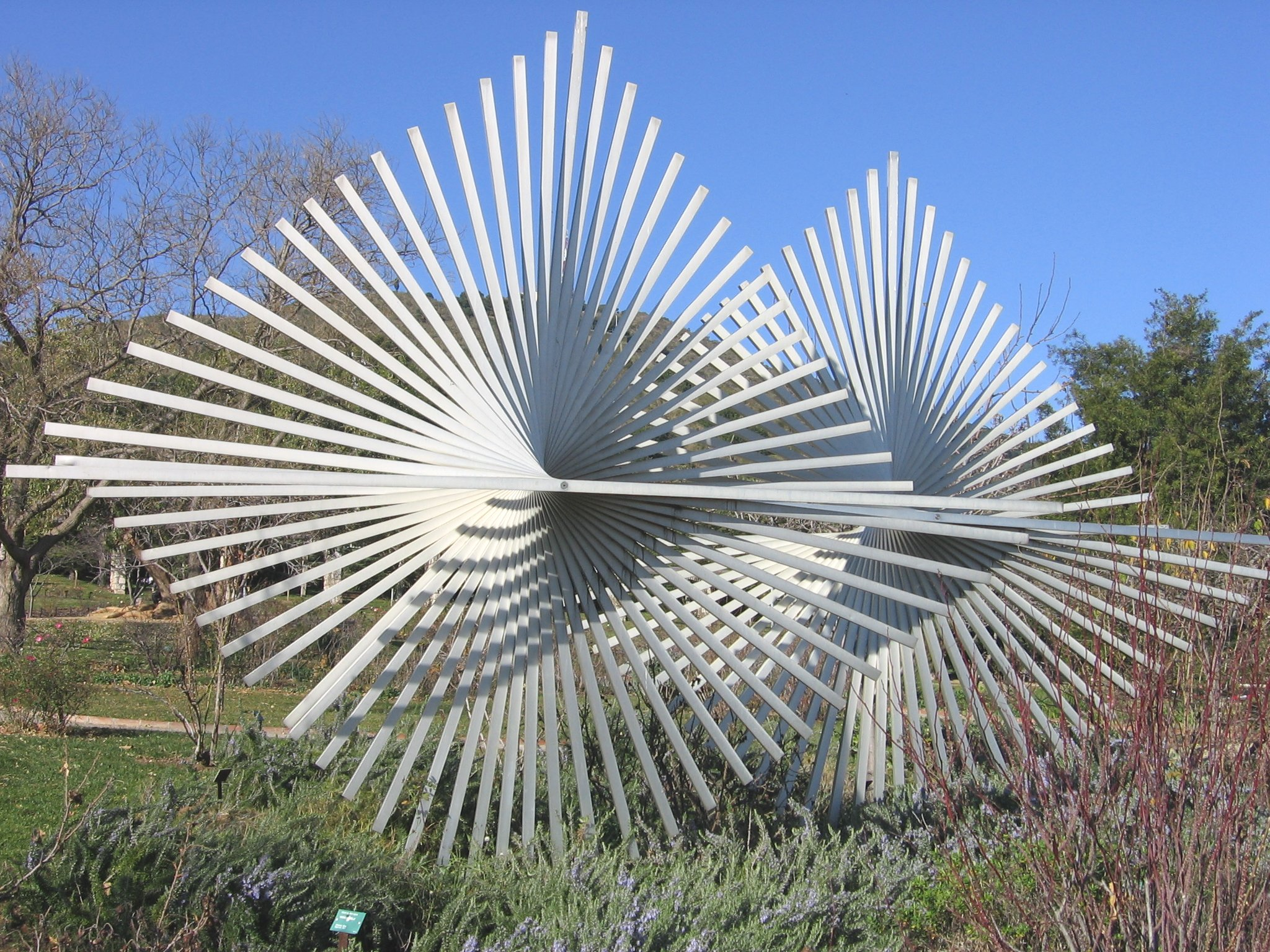
Rombos gemelos, by Andreu Alfaro

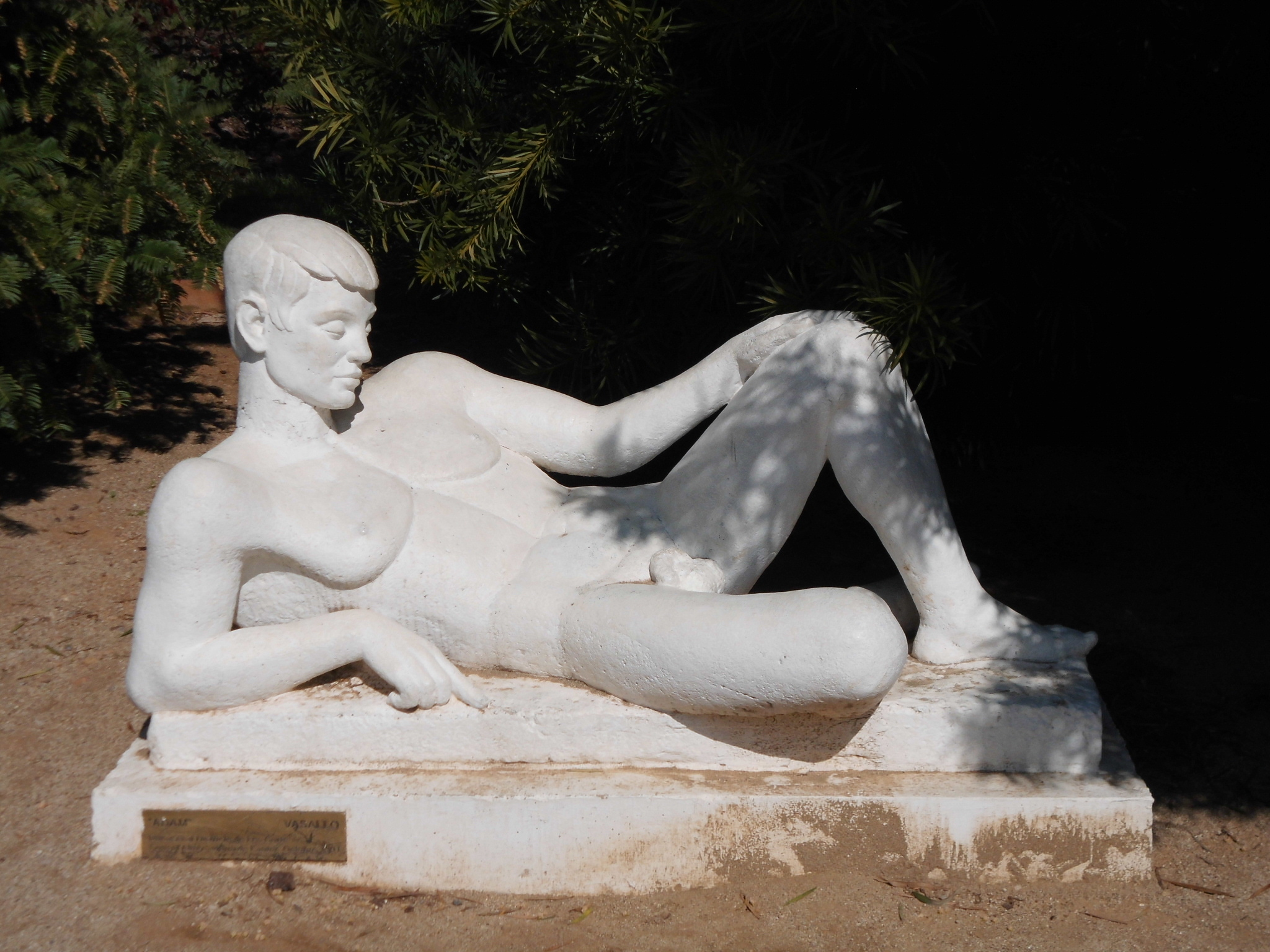
Adán, by Jacinto Bustos Vasallo

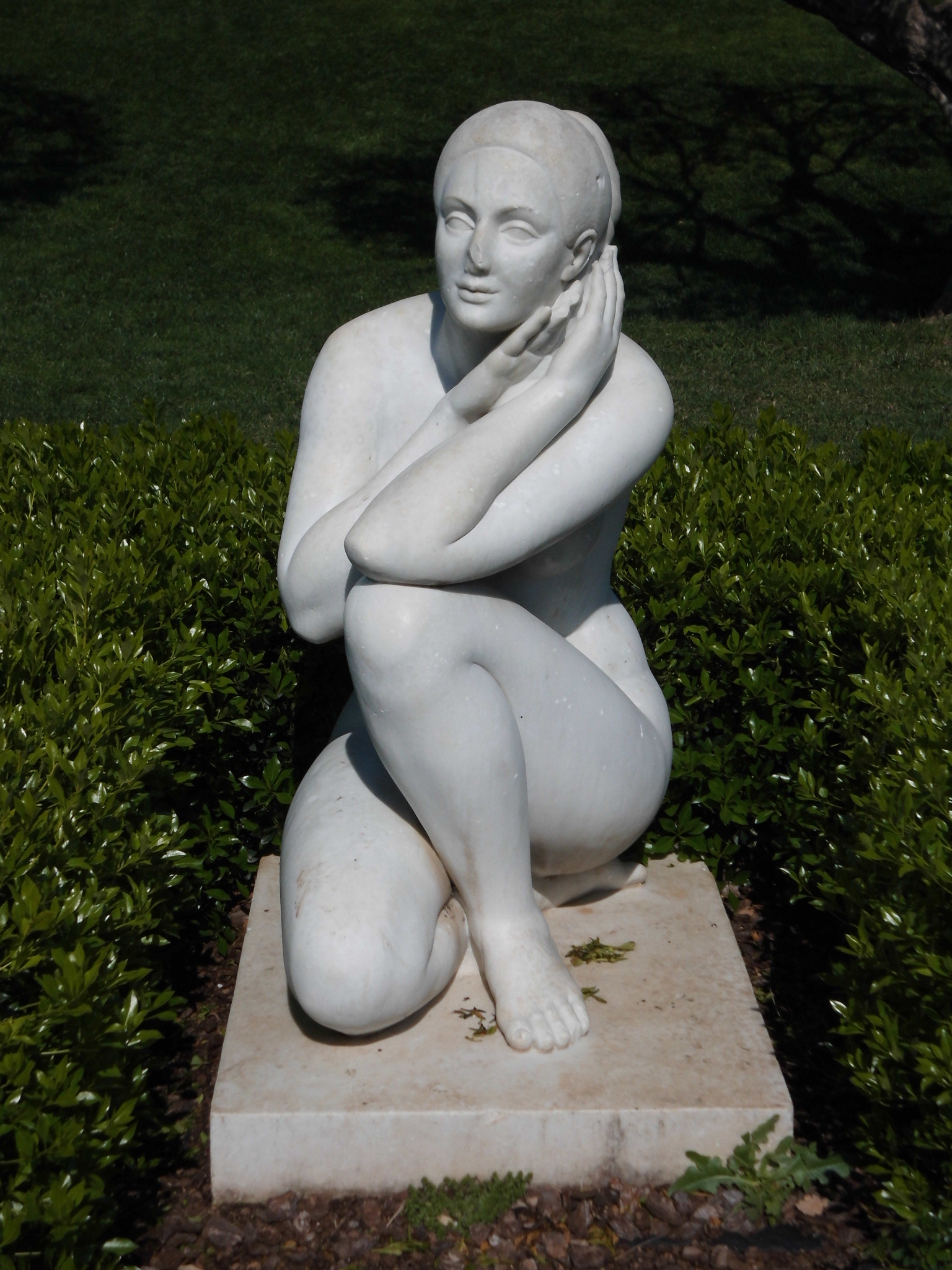
Serenidad, by Eulàlia Fàbregas de Sentmenat

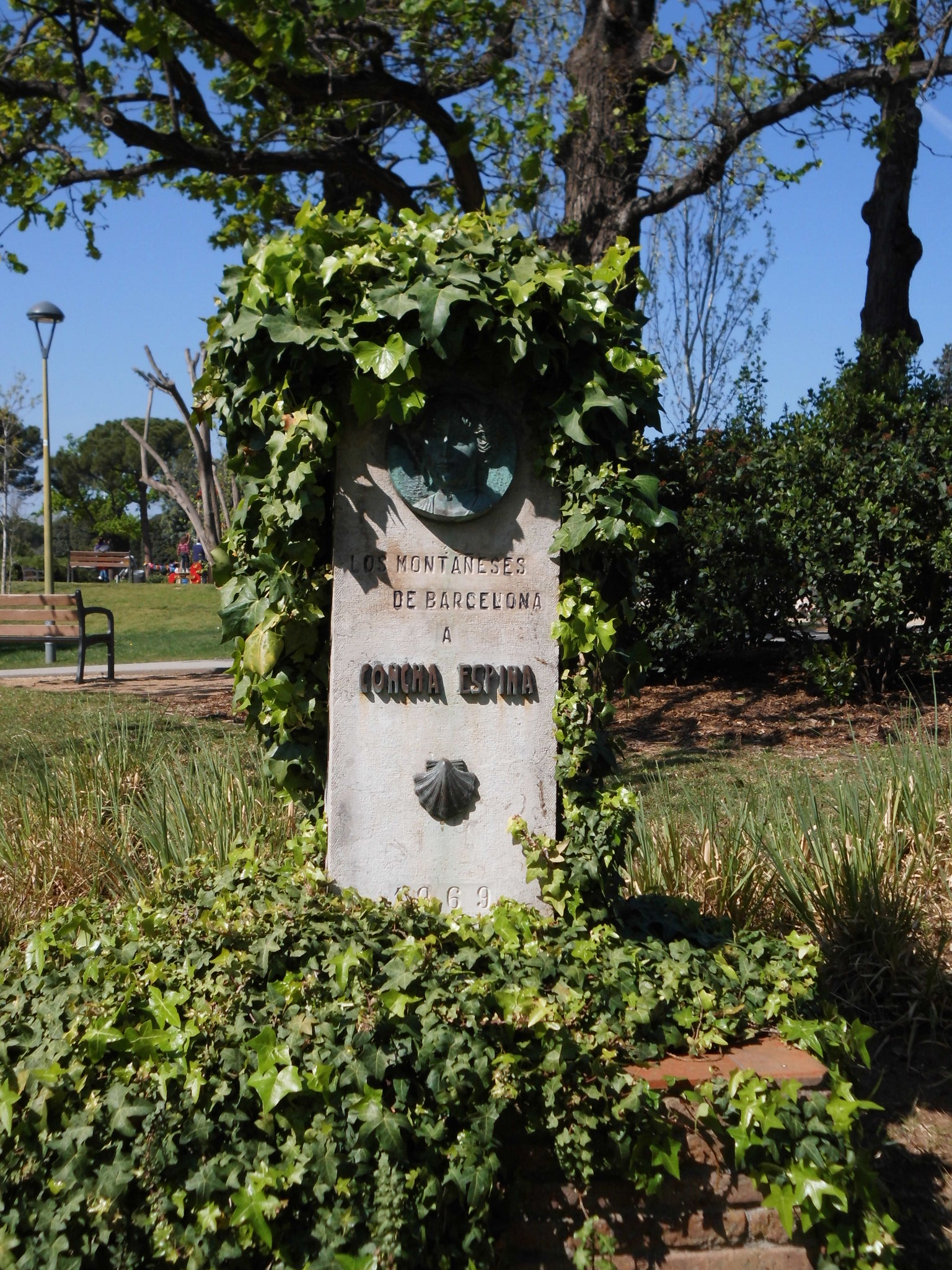
A Concha Espina, by Juan Díaz de la Campa

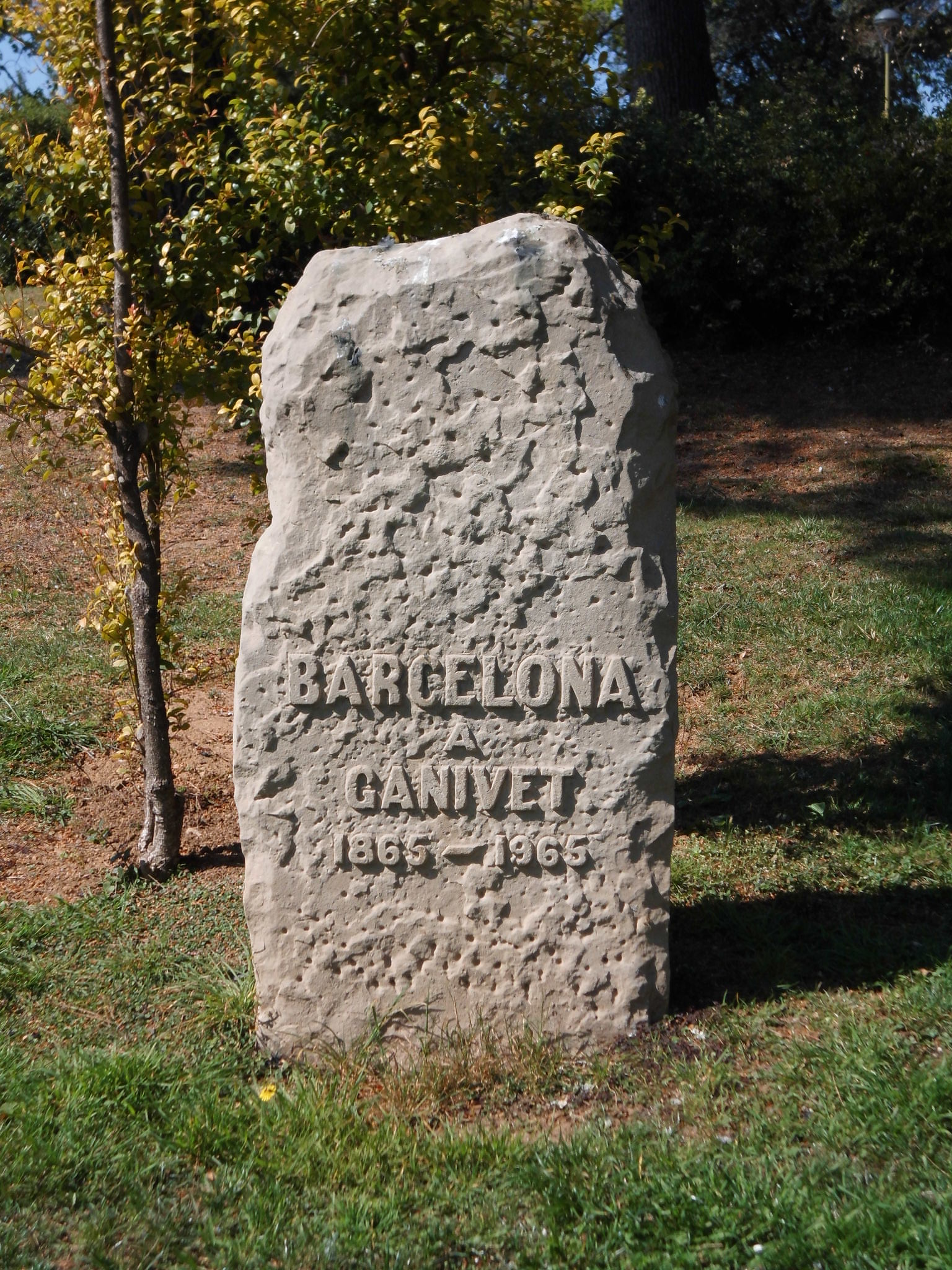
A Ángel Ganivet, by Jaume Monràs.
