= Castle of the Three Dragons =

Building in Barcelona, Catalonia, Spain

Coordinates: 41.3881°N 2.1834°E

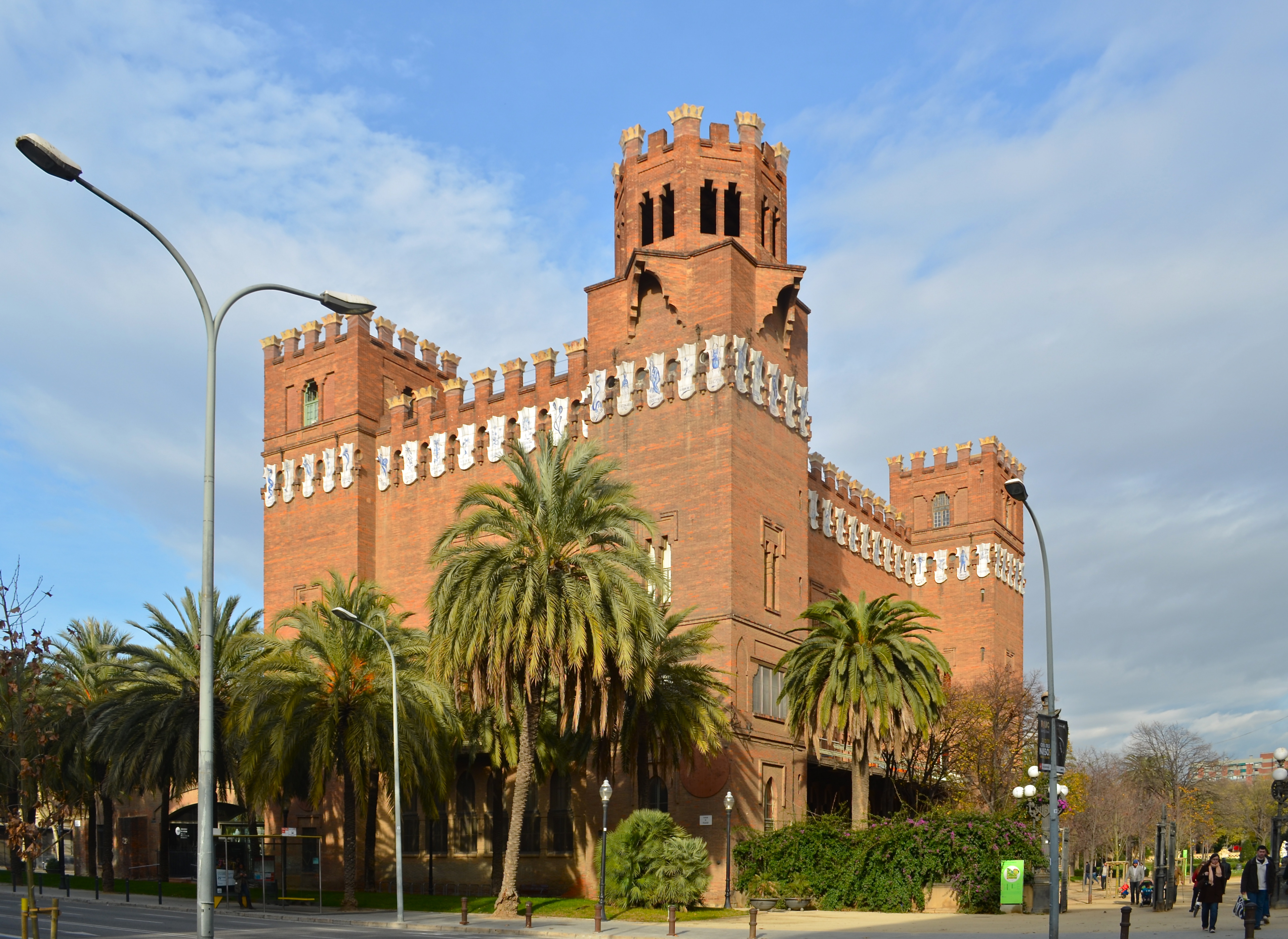
The Castle of the Three Dragons in winter.

The Castle of the Three Dragons (Catalan: Castell dels Tres Dragons, Spanish: Castillo de los Tres Dragones) is the popular name given to the modernisme building built between 1887 and 1888 as a Café-Restaurant for the 1888 Universal Exposition of Barcelona by Lluís Domènech i Montaner. This name was probably adopted from the 1865 play by Serafí Pitarra.

== History ==
In its time it was one of the main buildings of the exhibition, facing the now-disappeared Palace of Fine Arts. It was at the end of the main street running from the Arc de Triomf to the Parc de la Ciutadella. Work began in September 1887, but due to many delays, it was not ready on the day of the inauguration on April 8 and was delayed until August 17. For this reason Domènech i Montaner resigned as the responsible architect.

At the end of exhibition, Domenech installed an industrial arts workshop related to architecture, with the possible collaboration of Antoni Maria Gallissà i Soqué. Later it was dedicated to museum purposes as a museum of history, archeology, biology and natural sciences. During the Spanish Civil War it was closed, after suffering some bombing damage by Francoist aviation. From 1942 to 1945 it was a dining hall for Social Aid, and later returned to its function as the Zoology Museum of Barcelona, in which capacity it served, with some interruptions, from 1920 to 2010, when the collection were dismantled and relocated to the new Museum of Natural Sciences of Barcelona (in Catalan: Museu de Ciències Naturals de Barcelona) at the Forum Building. The building received a major restoration in the 1980s by architects Cristian Cirici, Pep Bonet and Carles Bassó.

== Building ==
It is built with brick and sheet iron, and is a castle-shaped building crowned with battlements. The floor is almost square, with four towers at the corners and perimeter walkways running between a double facade. It has an innovative transparent structure of brick and iron, something similar to that which appeared in the proposal by Hendrik Petrus Berlage in his project for the Amsterdam Stock Exchange.

The decoration, mostly in ceramic, features paintings by Joan Llimona and Alexandre de Riquer (1888), and Pius Font i Quer and Joan Baptista Aguilar-Amat (1927), sculptures designed by Antoni Vilanova and executed by Alfons Juyol (1888) and the Gonzalez Brothers (1927), and ceramics from the nearby Pujol i Bausis factory. Decorative elements can be seen on the battlements, where blue-on-white, shield-shaped panels depict a series of plants and animals, including a number of drinks and liquors. The stained glass windows, now partially lost, were the work of Antoni Rigalt i Blanch.

== See also ==
- List of Modernisme buildings in Barcelona
