= Willow wattle =

Willow wattle may refer to:

- Acacia salicina
- Acacia saligna
- Acacia iteaphylla
- Acacia pendula
