= Llopart =

Llopart is a surname. Notable people with the surname include:

- Mercedes Llopart (1895–1970), Spanish soprano
- Francesc Sabaté Llopart (1915–1960), Spanish anarchist
- Jorge Llopart (1952–2020), Spanish race walker

== See also ==
- Llompart
