= Parc de la Ciutadella =

Park in Barcelona, Spain

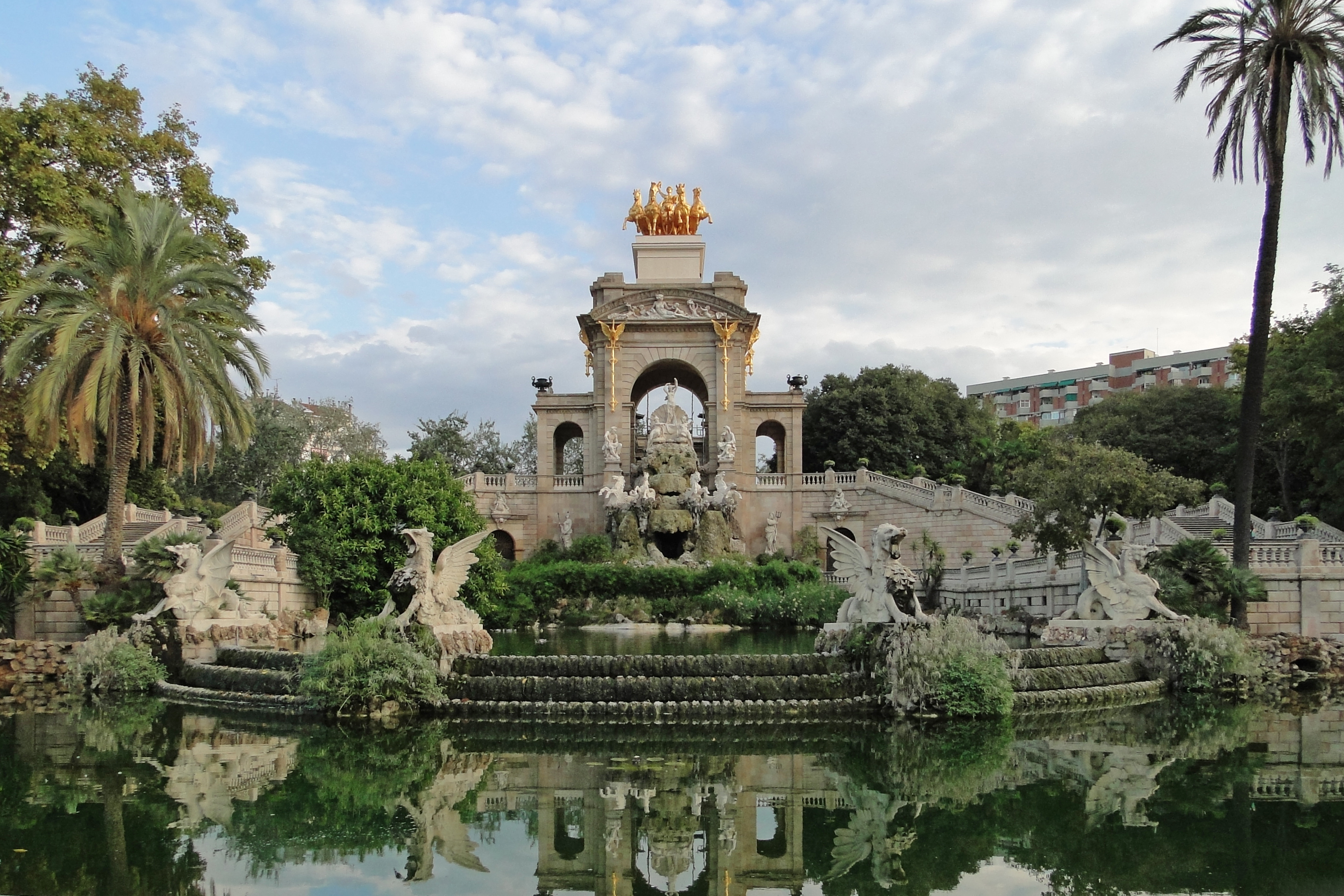
- The park's fountain
- Interactive map of Parc de la Ciutadella
- Type: Historical garden
- Location: Barcelona
- Coordinates: 41°23′17″N 2°11′15″E
- Area: 31 hectares (77 acres)
- Created: 1877
- Status: Open all year
- Website: Parcs i jardins de Barcelona

Spanish Cultural Heritage
- Type: Non-movable
- Criteria: Historic Garden
- Designated: 21 December 1951
- Reference no.: RI-52-0000030

The Parc de la Ciutadella (Catalan pronunciation: [ˈpaɾɡ də lə siwtəˈðeʎə]; lit. 'Citadel Park'; Spanish: Parque de la Ciudadela; Spanish pronunciation: [ˈpaɾke ðe la θjuðaˈðela]) is a park on the northeastern edge of Ciutat Vella, Barcelona, Catalonia, Spain. For decades following its creation in the mid-19th century, this park was the city's only green space. The 31-hectare (77 acres) grounds include the city zoo (once home to the albino gorilla Snowflake, who died in 2003), the Palau del Parlament de Catalunya, a small lake, museums, and a large fountain designed by Josep Fontserè (with possible contributions by the young Antoni Gaudí).

As the location of the Parliament of Catalonia, the tensions in 2018 and 2019 regarding Catalan independence regularly led to the police closure of the park to public access to prevent crowds forming near to the official buildings.

== Locations ==
=== Citadel ===
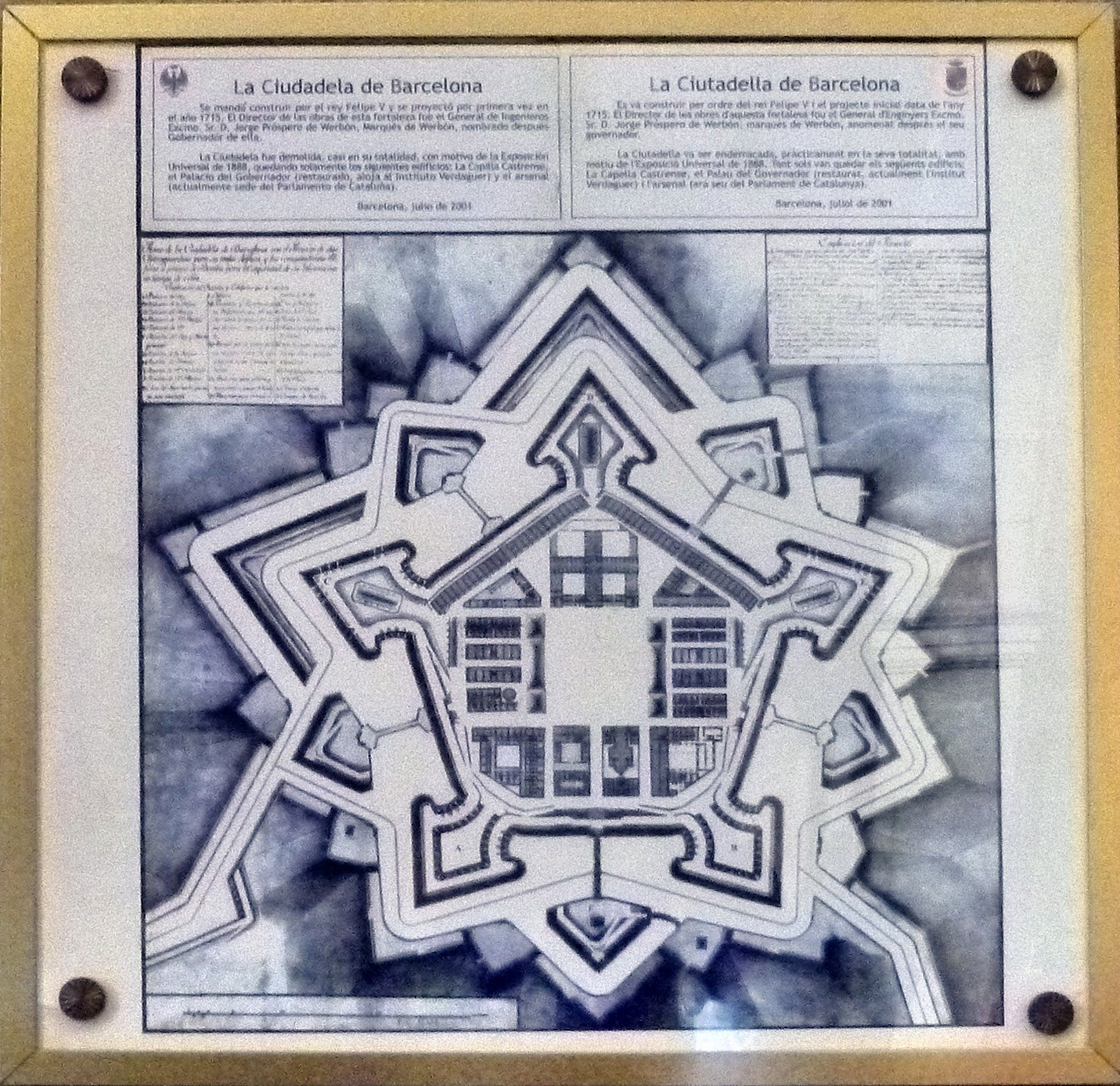
Map of the military compound of Ciutadella

In 1714, during the War of the Spanish Succession, Barcelona was laid siege for 13 months by the army of Philip V of Spain. The city fell, and in order to maintain control over it, and to prevent the Catalans from rebelling as they had in the previous century, Philip V built the citadel of Barcelona, at that time the largest fortress in Europe.

A substantial part of the district it was constructed in (La Ribera) was destroyed to obtain the necessary space, leaving its inhabitants homeless. The fortress was characterized by having five corners, which gave the citadel defensive power, and by a rather wide surrounding margin, serving as location for the army's cannons. It included enough buildings to house 8,000 people.

Hundreds of Catalans were forced to work on the construction for three years, while the rest of the city provided financial backing for this and for warfare-related expenses as well, with a new tax named el cadestre. Three decades later a quarter was rebuilt around the fortress named Barceloneta, which is located inside the neighbourhood of Ciutat Vella.

In 1841 the city's authorities decided to destroy the fortress, which was hated by Barcelona's citizens. Yet two years later, in 1843, under the regime of Maria Cristina, the citadel was restored. In 1848, after Maria Cristina's abdication and as the citadel lost its use, General Espartero razed most of the buildings within the fortress as well as its walls by bombarding it from the nearby mountain fortress Montjuic, which helped him gain political popularity. By 1869, as the political climate liberalised enough to permit it, General Prim decided to turn over what was left of the fortress to the city and some buildings were demolished under Catalan orders, for it was viewed by the citizens as a much-hated symbol of central Spanish government.

The chapel (now the Military Parish Church of Barcelona), the Governor's palace (now Verdaguer Secondary School), and the arsenal (now home to the Catalan Parliament) remain, with the rest of the site being turned into the contemporary park by the architect Josep Fontserè in 1872. Nineteen years later, in 1888, Barcelona held the Exposición Universal de Barcelona extravaganza, inspired by Mayor Rius i Taulet, and the park was redesigned with the addition of sculptures and other complementary works of art. This marked the conclusion of the old provincial and unprogressive Barcelona and the establishment of a modern cosmopolitan city. From that point until 1892, half of the park's layout was enhanced again in order to obtain sufficient space for the zoo. The park's bandstand, Glorieta de la Transsexual Sònia, is dedicated to a transsexual woman, Sonia Rescalvo Zafra, who was murdered there on 6 October 1991 by right-wing extremists.

=== Cascada ===
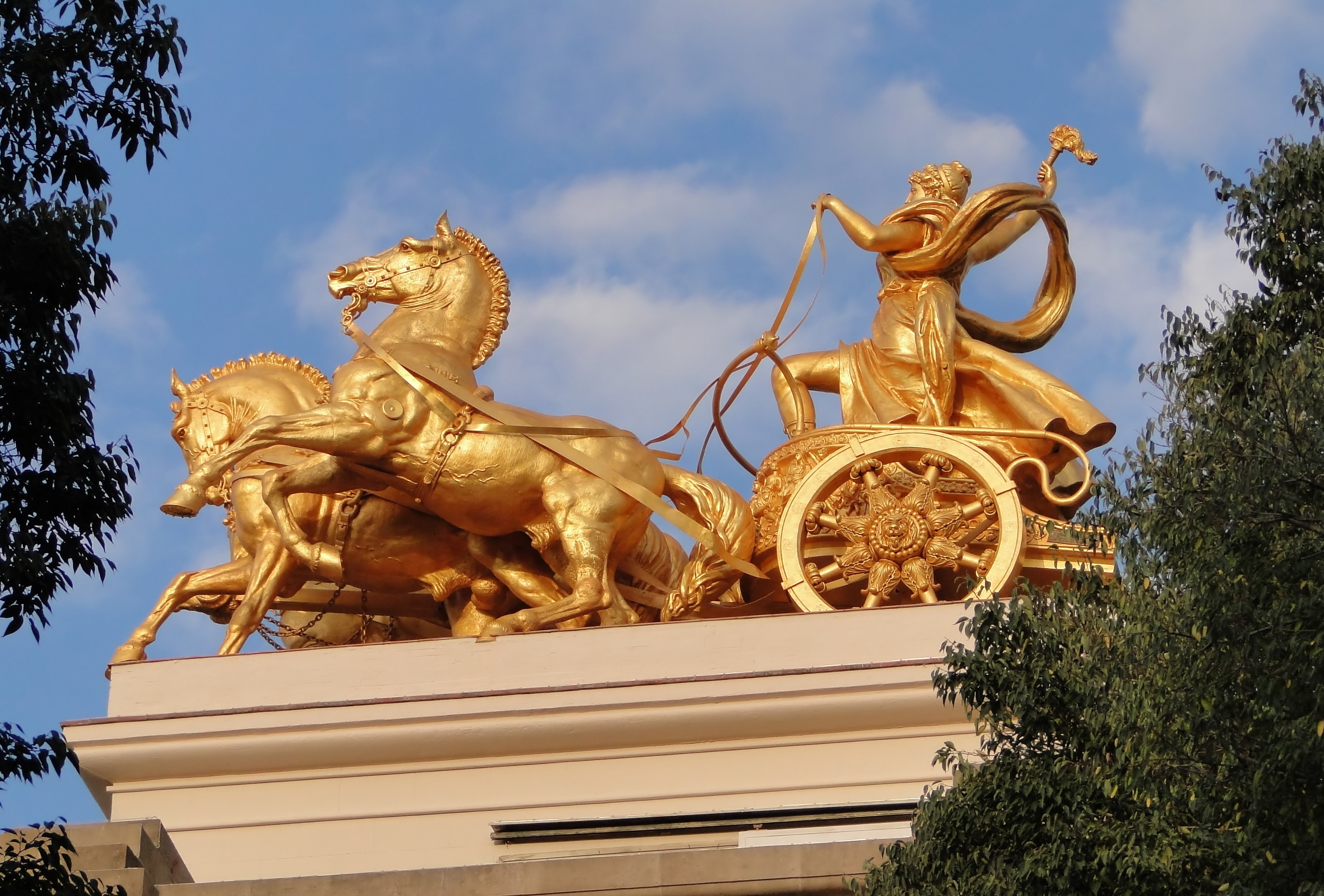
Quadriga de l'Aurora on the top of the Font de la cascada

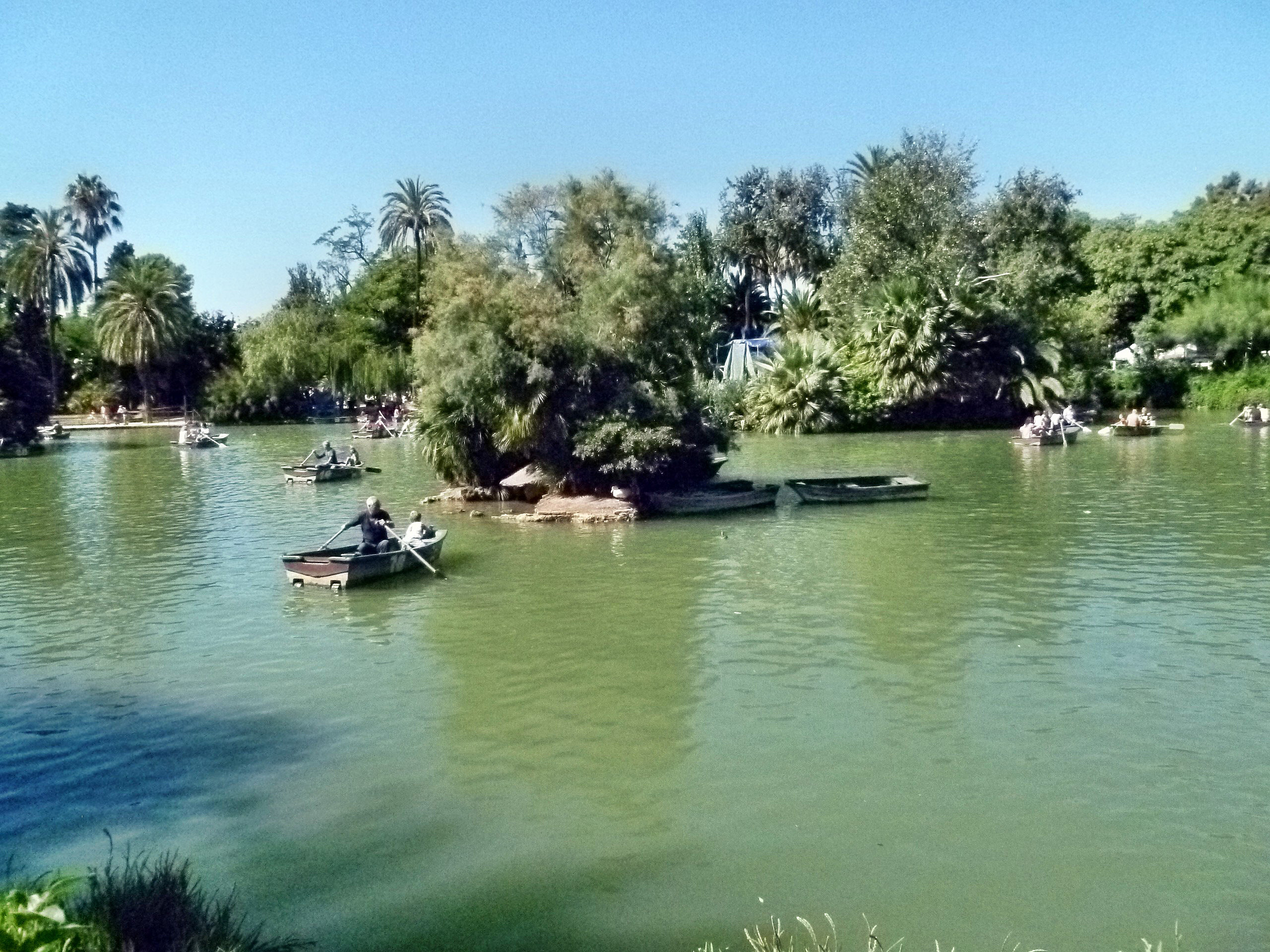
The lake in the Parc de la Ciutadella

The Cascada (waterfall or cascade in Spanish) is located at the northern corner of the park opposite to the lake. It was first inaugurated in 1881 without sculptures or any meticulous details, and was thereby criticized by the press, after which this triumphal arch was thoroughly amended by the addition of a fountain and some minor attributes, which required six years of construction from 1882 to 1888, and was thenceforth put on display at the Universal Exhibition, and hitherto not been redesigned. It was erected by Josep Fontserè and to a small extent by Antoni Gaudí, who at that time was still an unknown student of architecture. Fontserè aimed to loosely make it bear resemblance to the Trevi Fountain of Rome. Two enormous pincers of gigantic crabs serve as stairs to access a small podium located in the centre of the monument. In front of it a sculpture (designed by Venanci Vallmitjana) of Venus standing on an open clam was placed. The whole cascade is divided in two levels. From the podium on a path leads to the Feminine Sculpture and to the northeastern corner of the park, and upon following the route down the stairs the fountain's pond is rounded and the southern tip of the artifact is reached.

=== Zoo ===
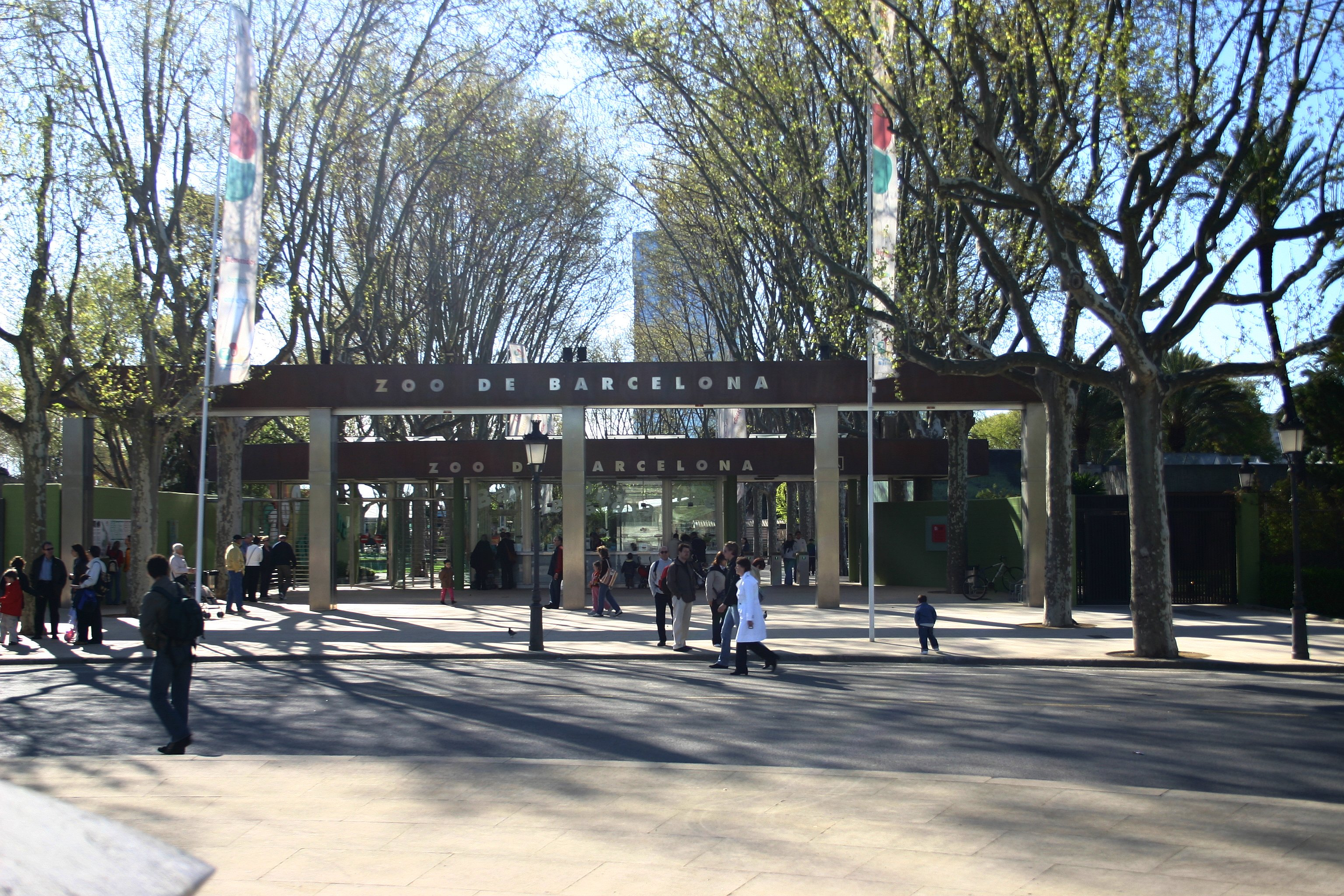
The zoo's main entrance

The zoo of Barcelona is located in the park of the ciutadella due to the availability of a few buildings which were left empty after the Universal Exposition of 1888. It was inaugurated in 1892, during the day of the Mercé, the patron saint of the city. The first animals were donated by Lluís Martí i Codolar to the municipality of Barcelona, which gratefully approved of their accommodation in the zoo.
Nowadays, with one of the most substantial collections of animals in Europe, the zoo affirms that their aim is to conserve, investigate, and educate.
From 1966 to 2003 the zoo was home to the famous albino gorilla Snowflake, who attracted many international tourists and locals.
Apart from the usual visits, different types of guided tours or other activities are offered, like for example 20 types of diversionary workshops, excursions and fieldtrips for schoolchildren, or personnel training and educational courses in zoology for adults. More than 50,000 children visit the zoo on an annual basis, which is the reason for the zoo's emphasis on education.

=== Museum of Natural Sciences of Barcelona ===
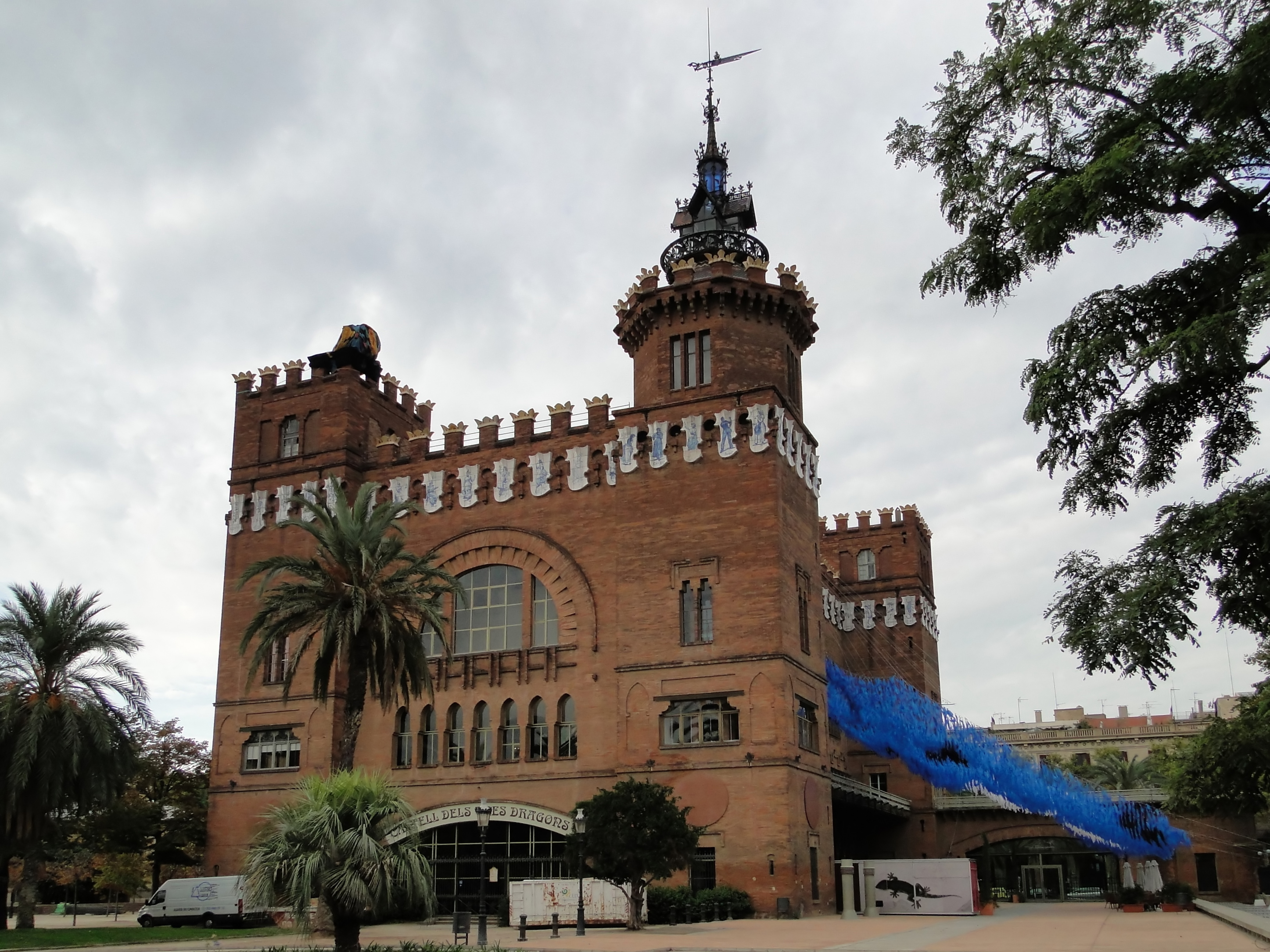
The facade of the Castle of the Three Dragons

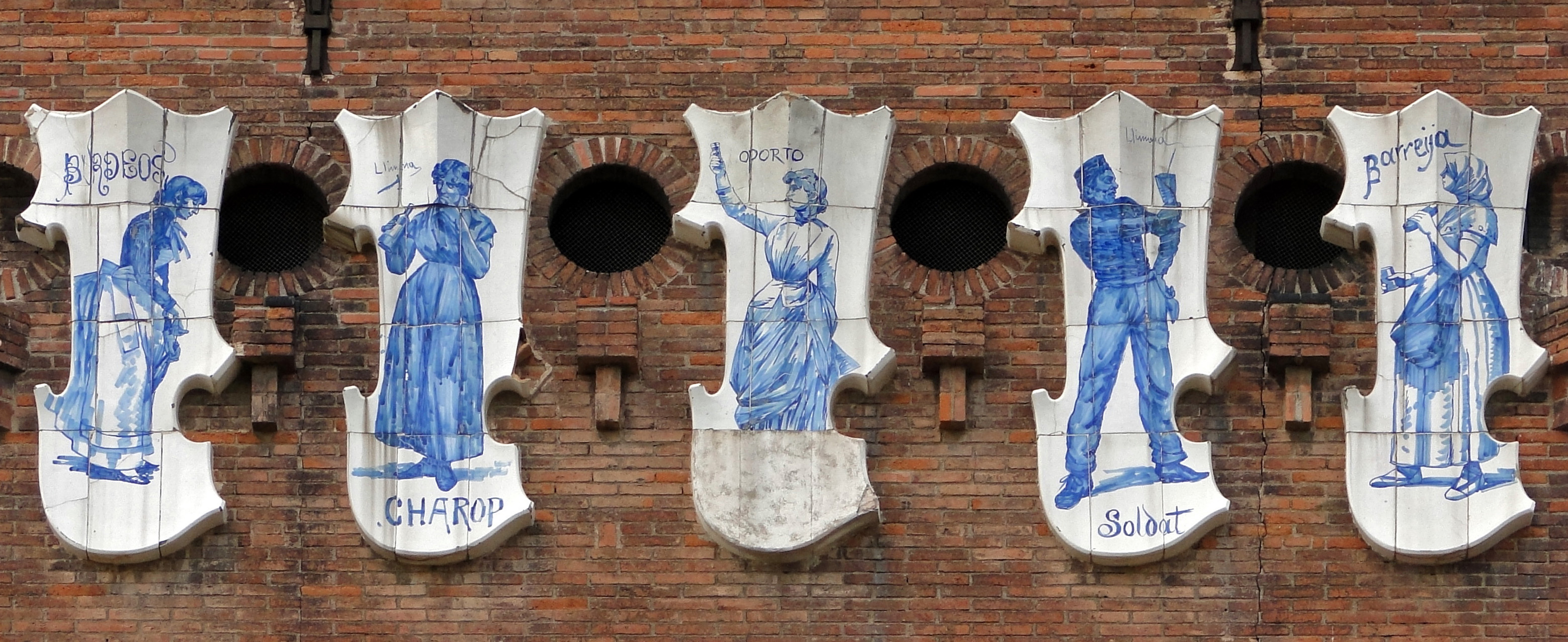
Ceramics on the facade of the Castle of the Three Dragons

The Museum of Natural Sciences of Barcelona comprises a museum of zoology and a museum of geology, both sited in the park, but also other science facilities elsewhere in Barcelona. The Museu Martorell (the Geology Museum) was administered by the city of Barcelona from 1882 to 2010. The Museum of Zoology was administered by the city from 1920 to 2010. Both museums are closed for the moment as the Museum of Natural Sciences of Barcelona is planning new functions for them.

The Castle of the Three Dragons was constructed for the Exposición Universal de Barcelona (1888) by the architect Lluís Domènech i Montaner to serve as an exhibition. Most of the building is constructed of red brick. Later, in 1920, it reopened as the museum of zoology. In the time when the museum was opened to the public, the most popular displays were the skeleton of a whale and exhibits dedicated for children. It also kept valuable collections from the animal kingdom; urban birds; and an apiary. The institute's stated aims were to enhance knowledge and conservation of the natural diversity of Catalonia and its surroundings, to promote public education on the natural world, to transmit ethical values of respect for nature, and to stimulate informed debate on the issues and environmental problems that concern society.

The geology museum had permanent exhibitions on the subject of mineralogy, petrology and paleontology; the volcanic region of Olot; minerals' secret colors. Its collections are a legacy of the scientist Francisco Martorell i Peña (1822–1878), who donated his whole collection of artifacts of cultural and archeological importance, his scientific library, and an amount of 125,000 pesetas to the city for the purpose of creating a new museum. The building, built during the same year and named the Corporación Municipal, was designed by Antoni Rivas i Trias.

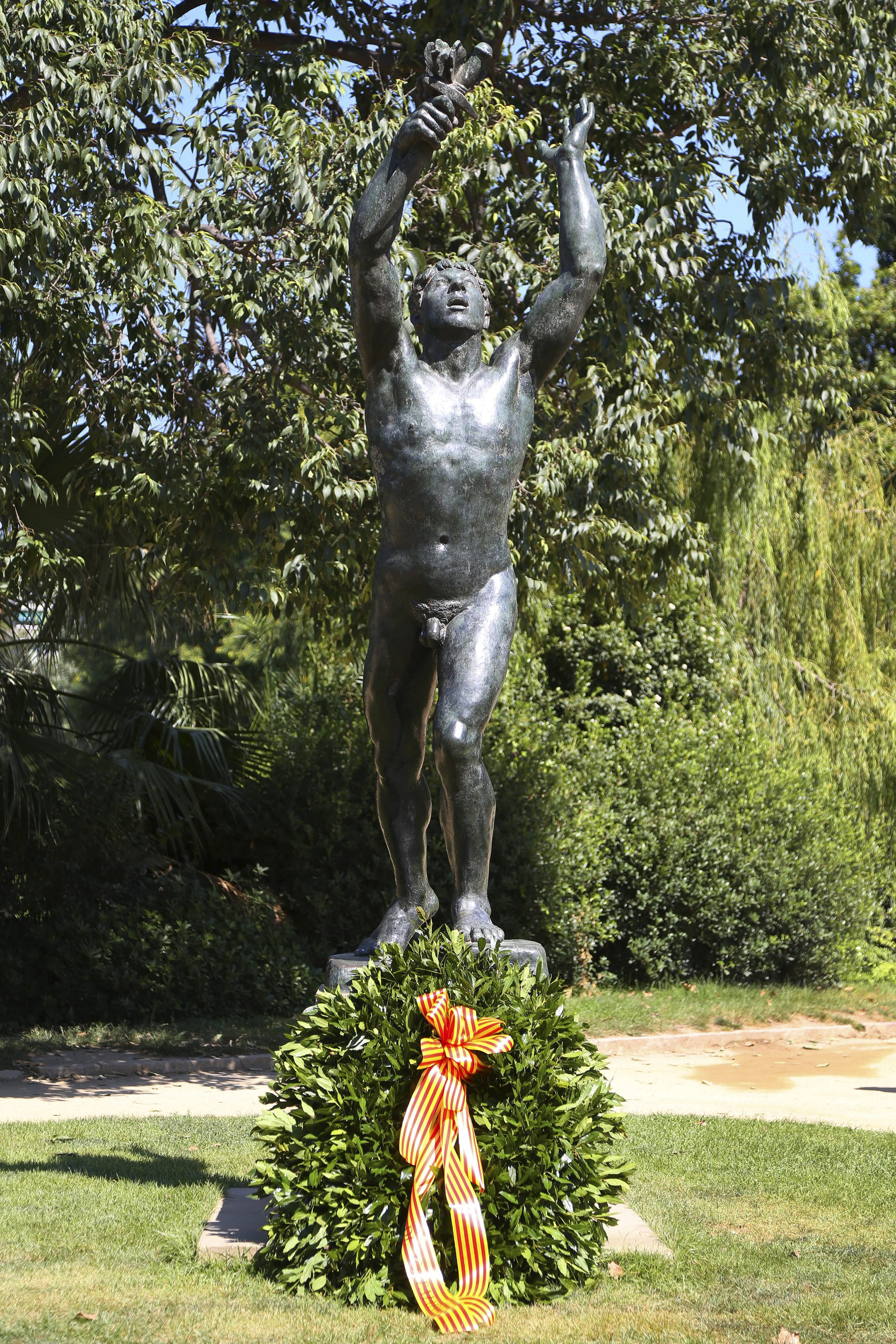
Als Voluntaris Catalans

=== Als Voluntaris Catalans ===
The history of sculpture, a bronze nude of a young man with arms raised, dates back to 1918 when it was agreed to erect a monument to the Catalan volunteers killed on the battlefield under the Allied flags. The work was commissioned to Josep Clarà and its execution can be followed in the minutes of the municipal plenaries of the time. In 1923 the sculptor had already finished the monument, but the arrival to power of Primo de Rivera paralyzed the project. Francoist Spain made impossible to celebrate any public act of Catalan self-determination, so the inauguration had to be postponed for thirteen years. Initially, it was considered to place the work in the Lesseps square between the street of the Bishop Morgadas and the one of Septimanía but finally it was located in the park of the Ciutadella where it has remained until today.

The sculpture was subject of violations in Francoist Spain. On the occasion of the Eucharistic Congress, in 1952, the monument was hidden by a huge screen. In December 1952 the statue's arms were cut off, so it was covered again with a box until its restoration. In 1954 the brass arms were restored and the young man's genitals got hidden with a vine leaf. The personal notes of the file of Clarà detail the displeasure of the sculptor about the treatment of his work.

On the 75th anniversary of its inauguration, the vine leaf has been removed, thus recovering the original nude. The sculpture is on display in a new location on the shallow bank of the lake.

== Transport ==
The Barcelona Metro and Trambesòs station Ciutadella-Vila Olímpica, on L4, is named after the park and the nearby area Vila Olímpica. The entrance to the park, however, is closer to the metro and Rodalies Barcelona (commuter train network) station Arc de Triomf. The city's central bus station Estació del Nord is also close.

== See also ==
- Urban planning of Barcelona
- Parks and gardens of Barcelona
