= Llompart =

Llompart (Spanish pronunciation: [ʎomˈpaɾt]) is a Spanish surname. Notable people with the surname include:

- Alex Llompart (born 1990), Puerto Rican tennis player
- Carlos Moyá Llompart (born 1976), retired Spanish tennis player
- Gabriel Llompart y Jaume Santandreu (1862 - 1928), Spanish ecclesiastic
- Jordi Llompart (born ?), Spanish-American, writer, producer, screenwriter and director
- María Llompart (born 2000), Spanish footballer
- Pedro Llompart (born 1982), Spanish basketballer
- Tomeu Llompart (born 1944), retired Spanish footballer
- Toni Muñoz (born 1982), Spanish footballer
- Xisco (footballer, born 1980), full name Francisco Javier Muñoz Llompart, retired Spanish footballer
