= Pius Font i Quer =

Spanish botanist (1888–1964)

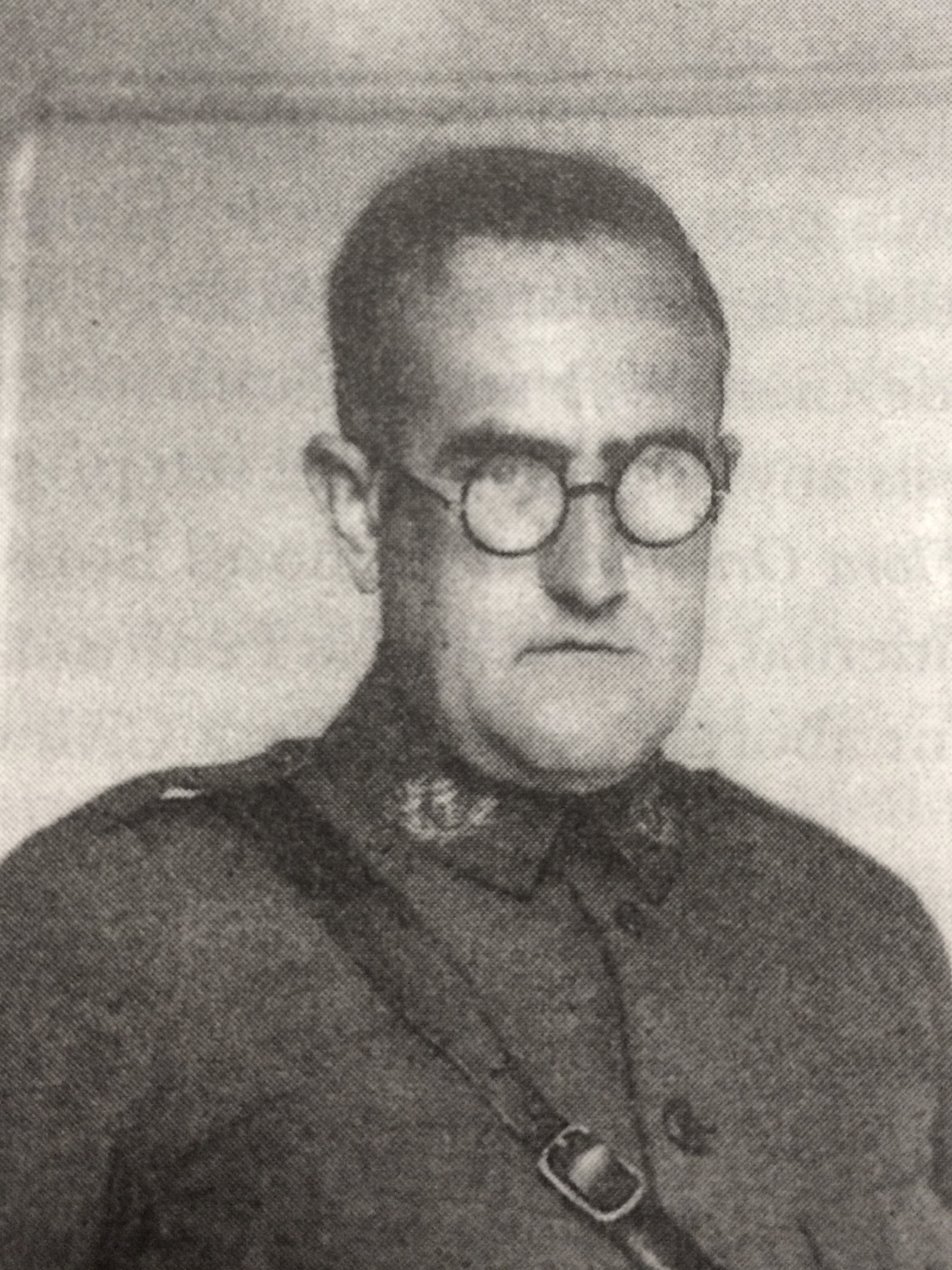
- Born: 1888; Lleida, Spain
- Died: 1964 (aged 75–76); Barcelona, Spain
- Citizenship: Spanish
- Known for: Founder of Jardí Botànic de Barcelona
- Scientific career
- Fields: Botany, Pharmacy, Chemistry
- Institutions: Health Military Corporation; Institut Botànic de Barcelona; Institució Catalana d'Història Natural; Institut d'Estudis Catalans
- Author abbrev. (botany): Font Quer

Pius Font i Quer (Lleida, 1888 – Barcelona, 1964) was a botanist, ethnobotanist, pharmacist and chemist, professor at the University of Barcelona and founder of the city's Botanical Garden.

Because of the perceived nationhoods and distinctions between different parts of the Catalan and Spanish territories, he is considered by some as "the greatest Catalan botanist" and by others as the "greatest Spanish botanist" by others.

== Life and career ==
=== Early life ===
Born in 1888, in Lleida, Font was raised and spent his childhood in Manresa. He later graduated at the University of Barcelona (1905–1908).

He got his doctorate in pharmacy (1905) with his thesis about the Flora of Bages. He was professor on pharmacy and botany at Universitat de Barcelona and at Barcelonan Escola d'Agricultura.

=== Military and teaching career ===
In 1911 he joined the Health Military Corporation, in which he was given the military rank of tinent coronel farmacèutic. After an early career as a military pharmacist during the Rif War, a conflict between Spain's military and Indigenous peoples of the Rif region in Northern Morocco, Font i Quer became assistant at the University of Barcelona's school of pharmacy in 1917. He was full professor between 1921 and 1923 and again after 1933 until his destitution and imprisonment in June 1939.

He was also president of the Institució Catalana d'Història Natural (1931–1934) and declared in 1931 to be "ashamed for Barcelona not to have its own Botanical garden" He worked with famed Catalan botanist Joan Cadevall Diars (1846–1921) on their monumental Flora de Catalunya, initiated in 1915 and that he finished alone after Cadevall's death.

Font himself was on a botanic expedition in Albarracín (Aragon) with his fellowship from the Faculty when the Francisco Franco's 1936 coup d'état failed and began the Spanish Civil War. In order to head back to Barcelona, he had to cross and go through the war front; for this the reason he was accused of being a member of the military rebellion, briefly imprisoned, and lost all his honours, which made continuation of his scientific work difficult. However, Font i Quer had affinities with the Republican faction, being close friend and colleague of Xavier Palomas i Bons, pharmacy professor in Barcelona, was assassinated in 1938.

=== During Franco's dictatorship ===
After the end of the Civil war, Font organized the Institut Botànic de Barcelona and founded the city's Jardí Botànic. He became president of the Institut d'Estudis Catalans in 1958 and of the Société Botanique at Geneva, an honorary vice-president of the International Botany Congresses at Paris (1954) and Edinburgh (1964) as well as doctor honoris causa at the university of Montpellier. He died in 1964, in Barcelona.

== Legacy ==
=== Specialised botany and ethnobotany ===
Font was the main creator of scientific botanical terminology in Catalan and Spanish. Some species and subspecies have been named in honour of Font and bear the species epithet fontqueri. The standard author abbreviation Font Quer is used to indicate this person as the author when citing a botanical name.

Pius Font i Quer distributed several exsiccata works under the titles Iter Maroccanum: 1927–1930, Flora Iberica selecta (1934–1935) and Flora Hispánica, Herbario normal (1944–1954). His work describing the flore of the Spanish protectorate in Morocco, including local ethnobotanical uses of traditional medicinal plants, are considered seminal, and provide critical historical information about the traditional cultivation and uses of cannabis in northern Morocco.

=== Writings for the general public ===
His most well-known works are: Diccionario de Botánica (1953), which is the reference work for botany students in Spain; Plantas medicinales (1961); and Botánica pintoresca (1958). His research took place in Spain, but specially in Catalonia, southern Valencian Community and the Balearic Islands, mainly in Ibiza and Formentera. He also published the popular book, the "Renewed Dioscorides", still reprinted in the 21st century. The University of Barelona republished in 2015 his Introduction to Botany manual.

=== Legacy in urbanism and architecture ===
In his birth town, Lleida, a public square has been named "Glorieta Font i Quer" and included recently a controversial public sculpture. A public high school bears his name in Manresa. There are streets names after him in Barcelona (where the Jardí Botànic de Barcelona is located; since 1992) as well as Manresa, Lleida, Eivissa, Lloret de Mar, and El Vendrell.
