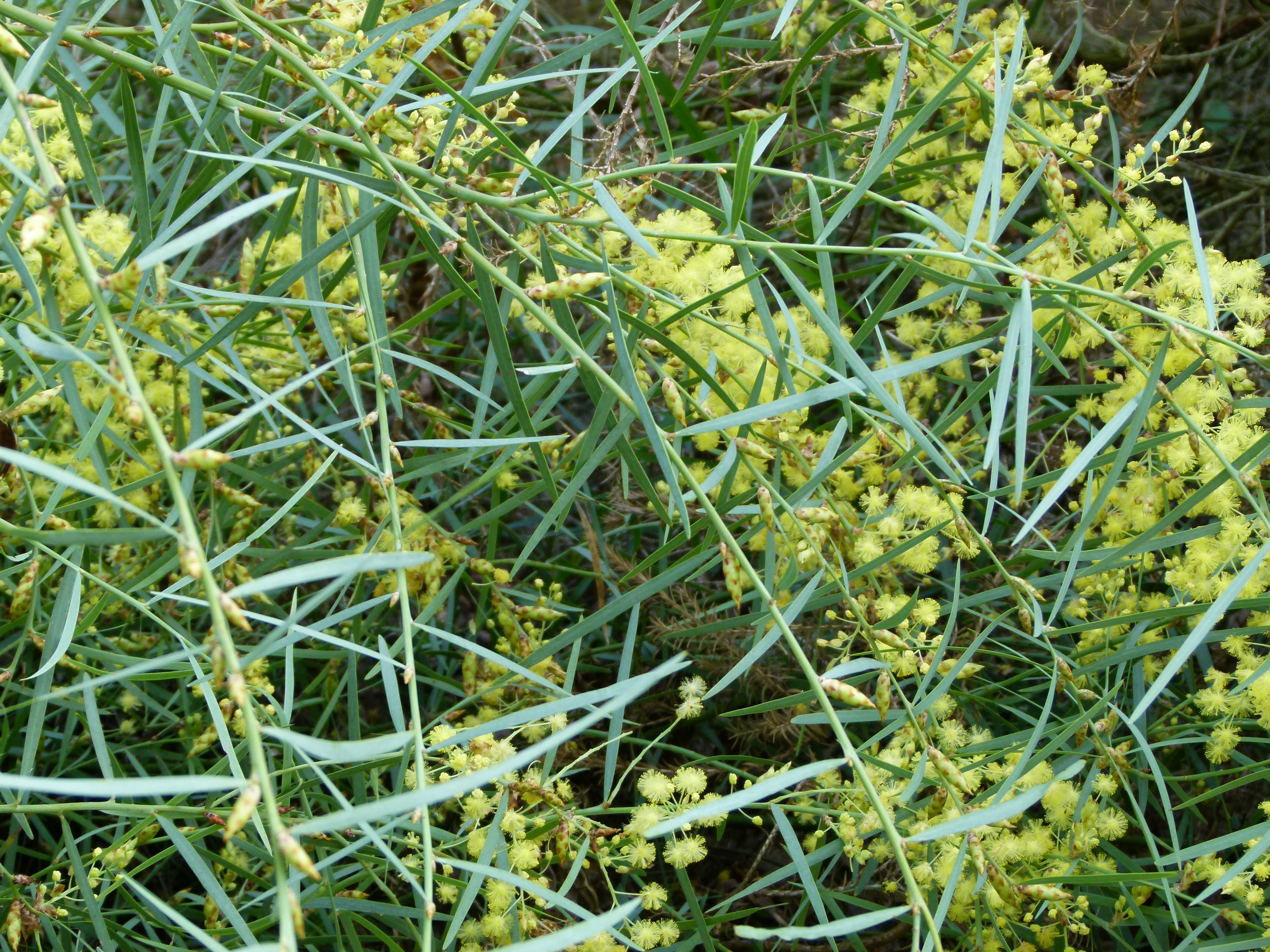
- In the Barcelona Botanic Garden

Scientific classification
- Kingdom: Plantae
- Clade: Tracheophytes
- Clade: Angiosperms
- Clade: Eudicots
- Clade: Rosids
- Order: Fabales
- Family: Fabaceae
- Subfamily: Caesalpinioideae
- Clade: Mimosoid clade
- Genus: Acacia
- Species: A. iteaphylla

Binomial name
- Acacia iteaphylla F.Muell. ex Benth.
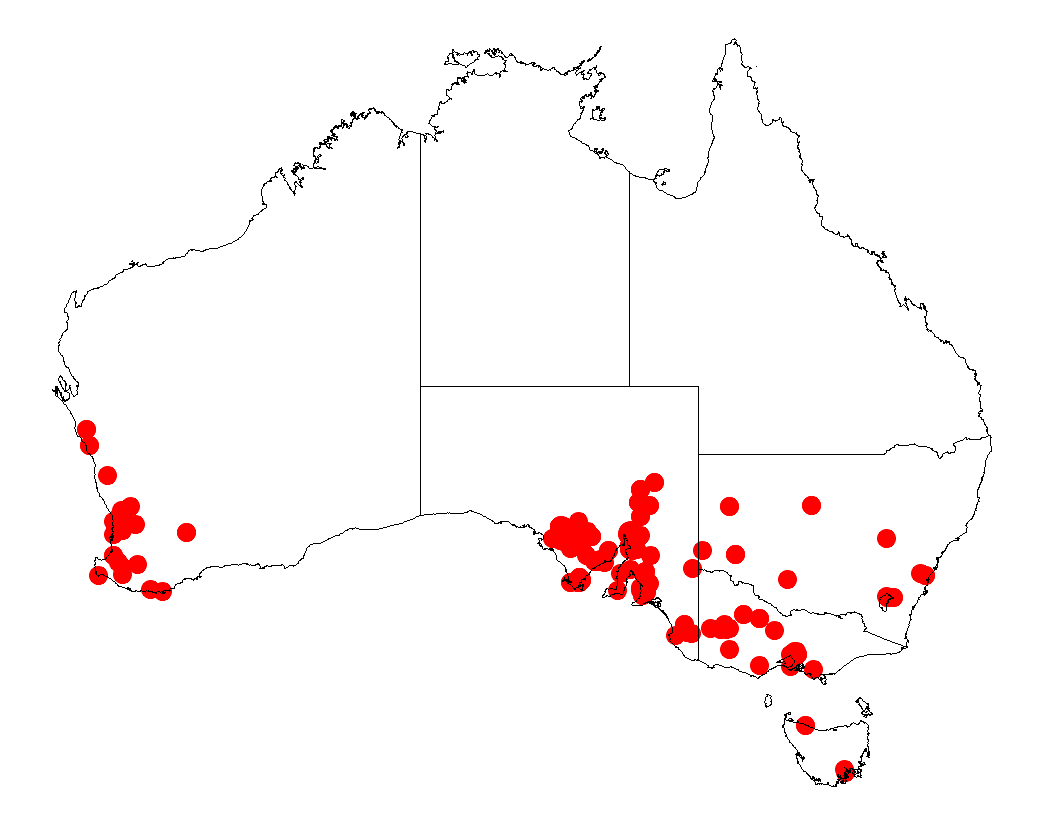
- Occurrence data from AVH

Synonyms
- Acacia iteaphylla F.Muell. ex Benth. var. iteaphylla; Racosperma iteaphyllum (F.Muell. ex Benth.) Pedley

= Acacia iteaphylla =

Flinders Range wattle

Species of plant

Acacia iteaphylla, commonly known as Flinders Range wattle, Port Lincoln wattle, winter wattle or willow-leaved wattle, is a species of flowering plant in the family Fabaceae and is endemic to South Australia, but has become naturalised as an environmental weed outside of its natural range. It is a bushy, spreading shrub with narrowly to broadly linear phyllodes, spherical heads of pale yellow to lemon yellow flowers and thinly leathery, glabrous pods.

== Description ==
Acacia iteaphylla is a bushy, spreading shrub that typically grows to a height of 2–4 m (6 ft 7 in – 13 ft 1 in) and has greenish bark on young plants. Its branchlets are glabrous, often become pendulous, and are usually covered with a thin, whitish powdery bloom. Its phyllodes are narrowly to broadly linear, 50–140 mm (2.0–5.5 in) long and 3.5–8 mm (0.14–0.31 in) wide, thin and glabrous with a delicate point 1–2 mm (0.039–0.079 in) long on the tip and a rather prominent midrib. The flowers are arranged in eight to sixteen spherical heads in racemes, on slender, glabrous peduncles 6–10 mm (0.24–0.39 in) long. Each head has 12 to 17 pale yellow to lemon yellow flowers. Flowering occurs in autumn and winter, and the pods are mostly 60–120 mm (2.4–4.7 in) long and 6–12 mm (0.24–0.47 in) wide, thinly leathery, often covered with a powdery bloom, and glabrous. The seeds are oblong to elliptic, 5–6.5 mm (0.20–0.26 in) long and more or less dull, dark brown to black with a narrow aril.

== Taxonomy ==
Acacia iteaphylla was first formally described in 1855 by George Bentham in the journal Linnaea from an unpublished description by Ferdinand von Mueller of a specimen he collected near Arkaba. The specific epithet (iteaphylla) is taken from the Greek words itea meaning 'willow' and 'phyllon' meaning leaf, referring to the narrow, willow-like leaves of the plant.

== Distribution and habitat ==
This species of wattle is native to the Flinders Range, Gawler Range and Eyre Peninsula of South Australia where it grows among rocky outcrops on hillsides or along rocky creek creeks. It is a woody weed in southern Australia, escaping from gardens and landscape plantings and is naturalised in some parts of New South Wales, coastal and sub-coastal districts of south-western Western Australia and central and western parts of Victoria.

== Use in horticulture ==
Acacia iteaphylla is sold commercially for cultivation in seedling and in seed form. It can take full sun or partial shade, can grow in saline soils and is frost tolerant and drought tolerant once established. Used in gardens as an ornamental screen or as a low windbreak, as it is fast growing and has attractive foliage. The best known cultivar of A. iteaphylla is a low-growing form called Acacia "Parsons Cascade". Seeds need to be scarified or treated with boiling water prior to planting.

== See also ==
- List of Acacia species
