= Mystery of the Nile =

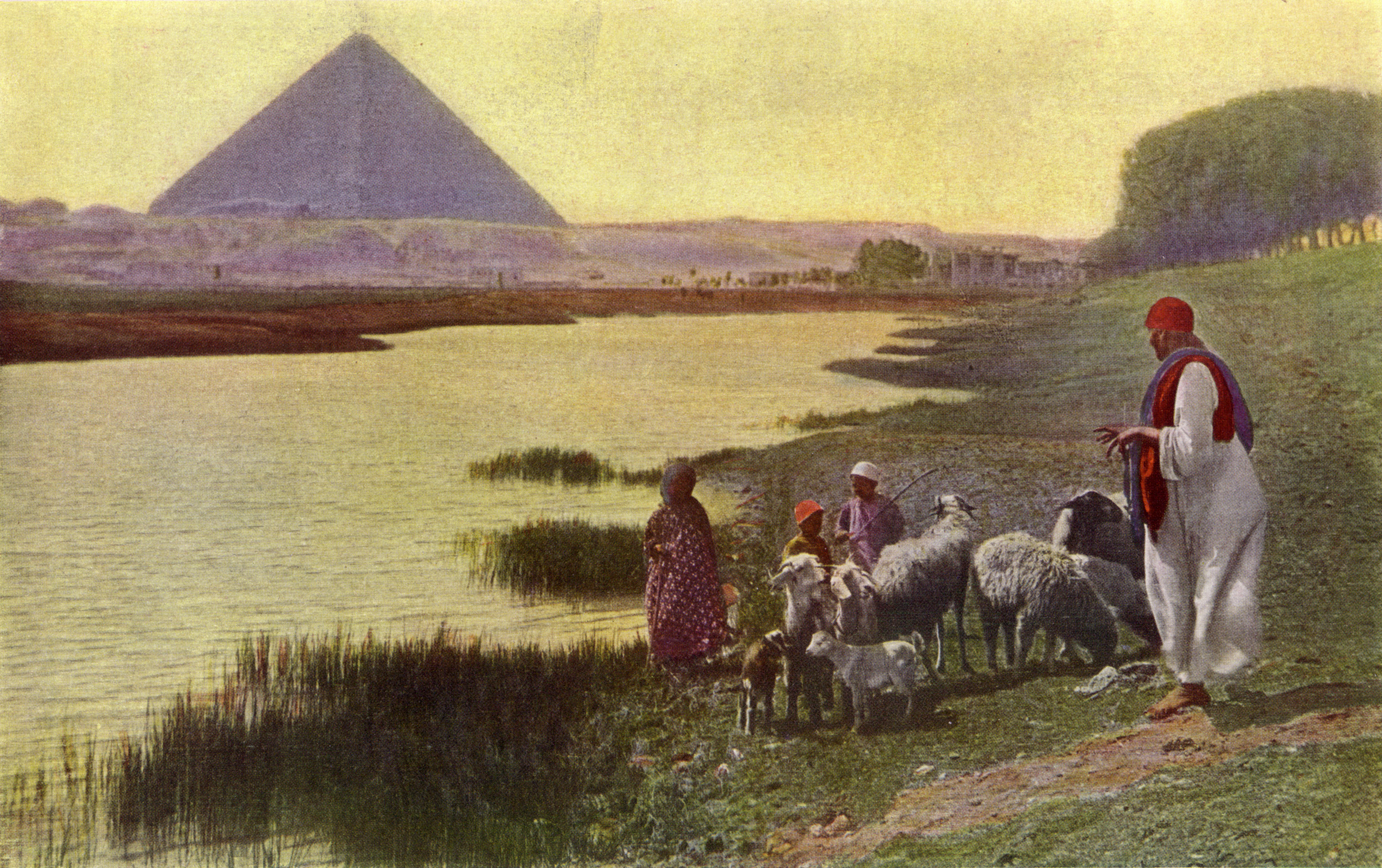
- Directed by: Jordi Llompart
- Written by: Jordi Llompart
- Produced by: Jordi Llompart; Greg MacGillivray
- Cinematography: Reed Smoot
- Edited by: Stephen Judson
- Music by: David Giró
- Distributed by: MacGillivray Freeman Films
- Release date: 2005 (Valencia)
- Running time: 48 minutes
- Country: United States
- Language: English

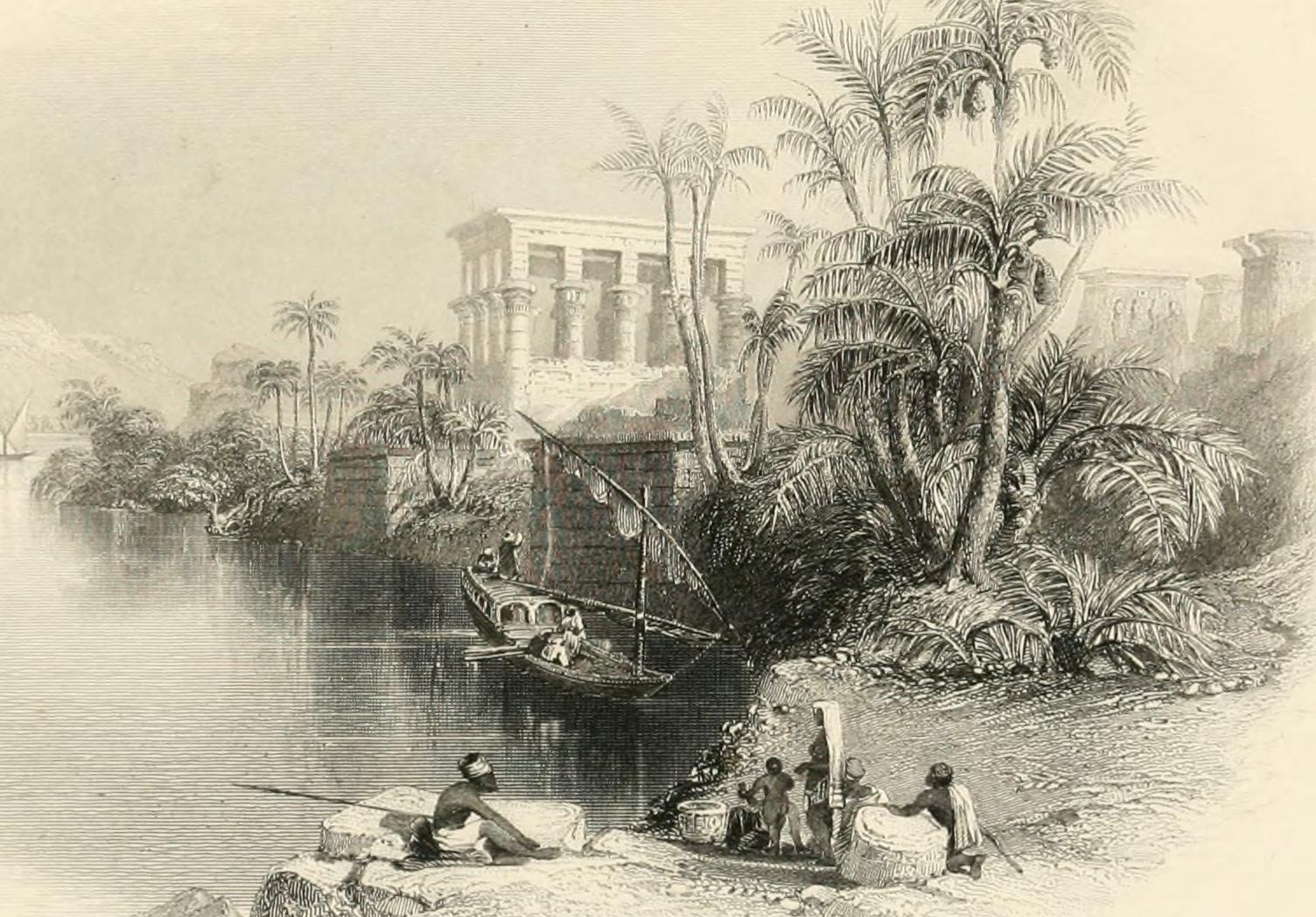
The Nile boat or, glimpses of the land of Egypt

Mystery of the Nile is a 2005 IMAX film documenting the first successful expedition to navigate the entire length of the Blue Nile and Nile from its source in Ethiopia to the Mediterranean Sea. The expedition was led by geologist Pasquale Scaturro. The journey took 114 days starting on December 22, 2003 and was finished on April 28, 2004. The film was released in 2005.
