= CosmoCaixa Barcelona =

Science museum in Barcelona, Spain

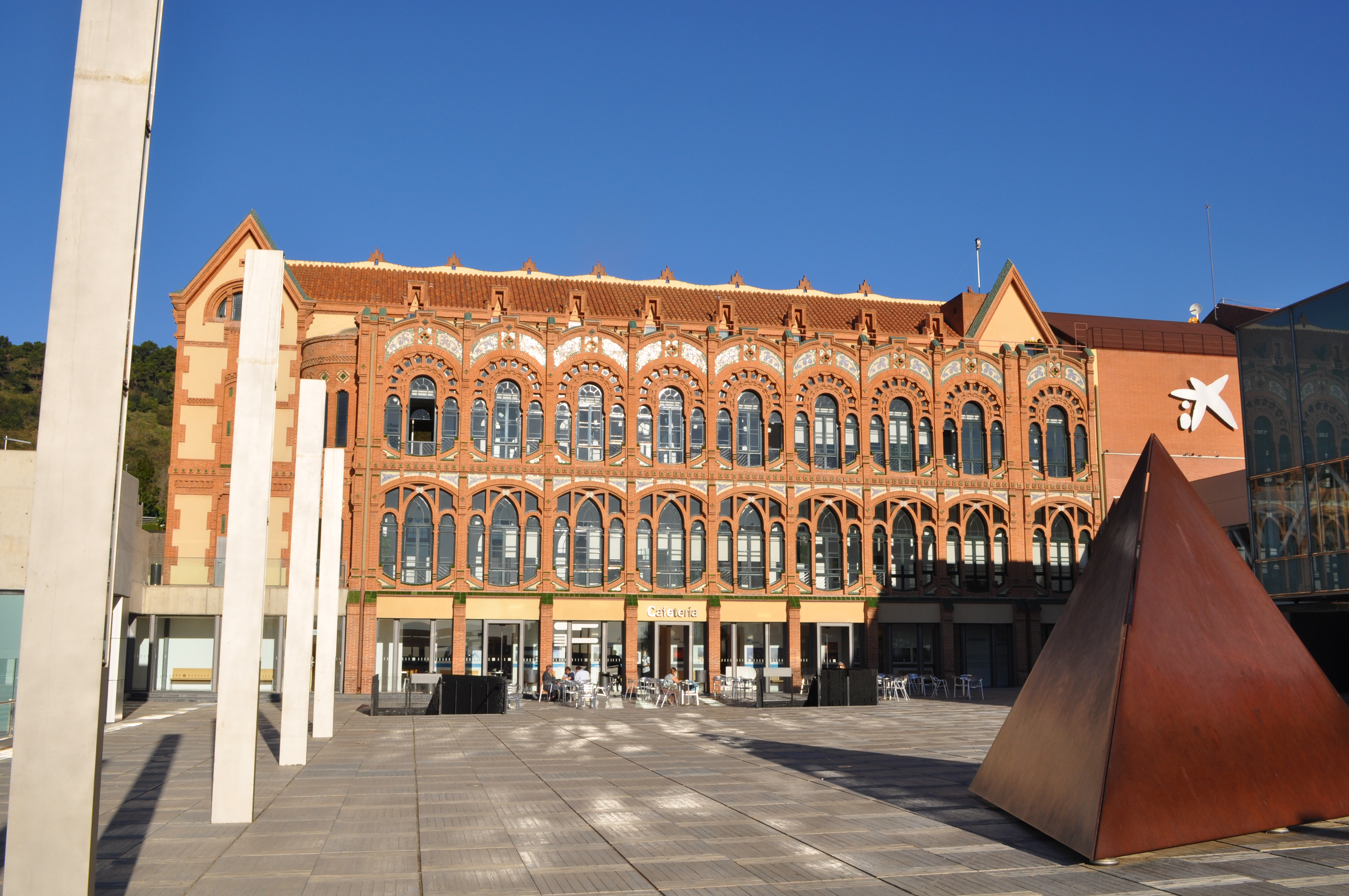
- Former name: Science Museum of Barcelona
- Established: 1981
- Location: Barcelona, Spain
- Coordinates: 41.413056°N 2.131111°E
- Type: Science museum
- Visitors: 2.424 visitors per day (2020)
- Director: Valentí Farràs
- Public transit access: Avinguda Tibidabo
- Website: www.cosmocaixa.com

CosmoCaixa Barcelona (Catalan pronunciation: [ˌkɔzmuˈkaʃə βəɾsəˈlonə]) is a science museum located in Barcelona, Catalonia, Spain. It features a variety of permanent and temporary exhibitions devoted to the environment, nature, science, and space. The museum is sponsored by "La Caixa" banking foundation.

Formerly known as the Science Museum of Barcelona, it closed for renovations in 1998 and reopened in 2004 under its current name. It has interactive exhibitions such as touch and play for small children, planetarium, bookstore, gift shop, library, teaching center and café. Entry to the museum is free for children under the age of sixteen. Adults can visit the museum with a regular ticket.

== Building ==
The building was built between 1904 and 1909 by Josep Domènech i Estapà to serve as an asylum for the blind which closed in 1979. The building was renovated, retaining the original facade, and an expansion took place bringing the building to four times its original size. An expansion of the building took place in 2004. CosmoCaixa has a large spiral walkway that takes visitors from the basement to the fifth floor. The centerpiece of the walkway is an Amazonian tree.

== Exhibitions ==
CosmoCaixa has permanent and temporary exhibitions. It also houses a planetarium and has a free public square that allows the public to experience natural science through interactive exhibitions. Entry tickets to the Planetarium are four euros for both adults and students. Tickets can also be bought at the museum on the first floor.

=== Flooded Forest ===
A flooded forest which allows visitors to experience wet and dry environs of an Amazon rainforest. Ceiba trees are reproduced based on molds created by museum staff in Pará, Brazil. More than a hundred living species are represented including birds, insects, frogs, piranhas, capybaras, and alligators.

=== Geological Wall ===
Large cuts of geological formations are displayed along a wall showing erosion, volcanism, faults, sedimentation and related processes. The cuts of rock on display are primarily from Catalonia including potassium salt from Súria, sandstone from Berga and Mallorca, volcanic materials from Zona Volcànica de la Garrotxa Natural Park, and limestone from Besalú.

=== The Universe Hall ===
The Universe's Hall, which is the main space in the museum, shows a tour starting with the Big Bang to the most actuality themes, including modern medicine, wastes and robotics, throw the human evolution and other shapes of evolution and science. They all are shown by interactive modules that make easier their comprehension.

=== Clik and Creactivity ===
One of three interactive based exhibitions for young children, Clik and Flash uses games to encourage children to learn about science. The space is split into two rooms; Clik uses play, observation and deduction through smell, touch and sight and Creactivity uses technology to showcase exploration, environments, construction and electricity.

=== Touch, touch! ===
Touch, touch! houses living creatures from around the world and the Mediterranean. Museum staff and scientists present animals and plants from three environments.

=== Bubble Planetarium ===
An astronomy based exhibition for children ages 3–8.

== Past exhibitions - historical spaces ==
=== Touch, touch! ===
Touch, touch! houses living creatures from around the world and the Mediterranean. Museum staff and scientists present animals and plants from three environments.

=== The Hall of Matter ===
The Hall of Matter covers evolution starting with the Big Bang. It is broken into four sections: the origin of matter, the first living organism, the conquest of "symbolic intelligence", and the birth of civilization. The exhibit touches on gravitational wave, chaos theory, biology, mobility, neurons, intelligence and human evolution.

== Gallery ==
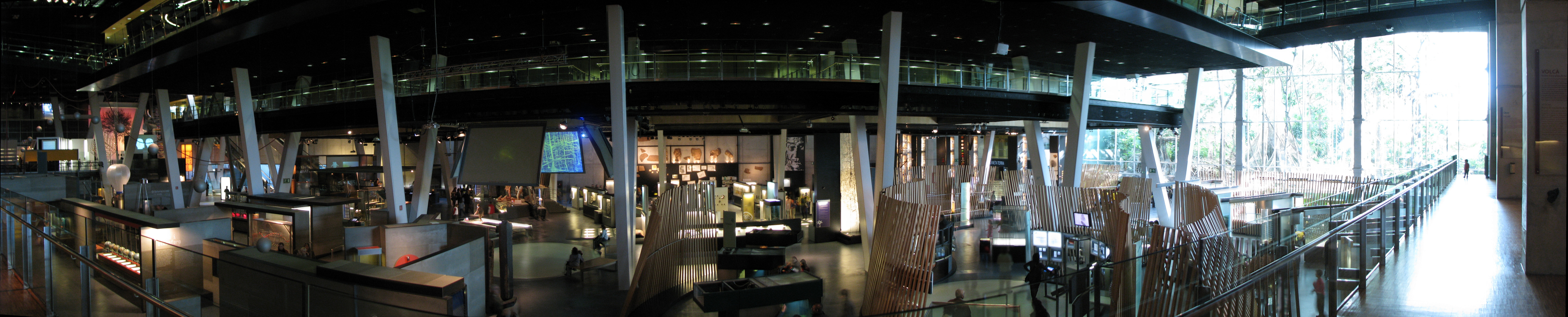
Panoramic view of the main hall

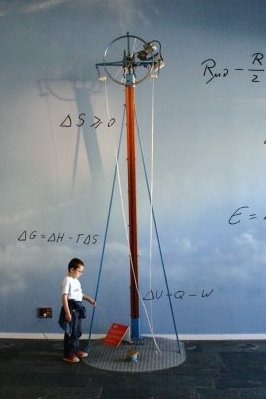
A child interacting with a lariat chain in The Hall of Matter

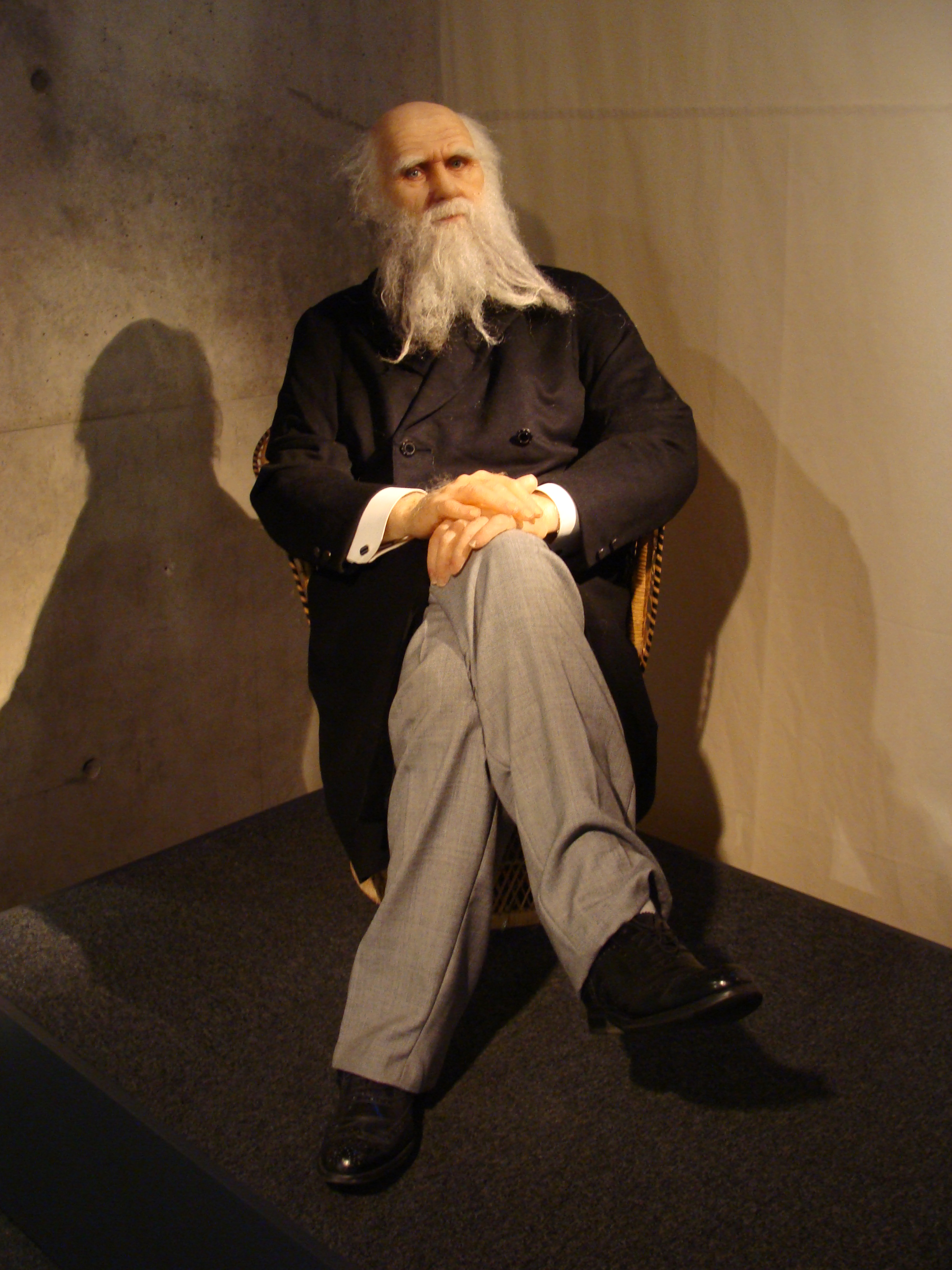
Charles Darwin in the exhibit Darwin observador, Darwin naturalista

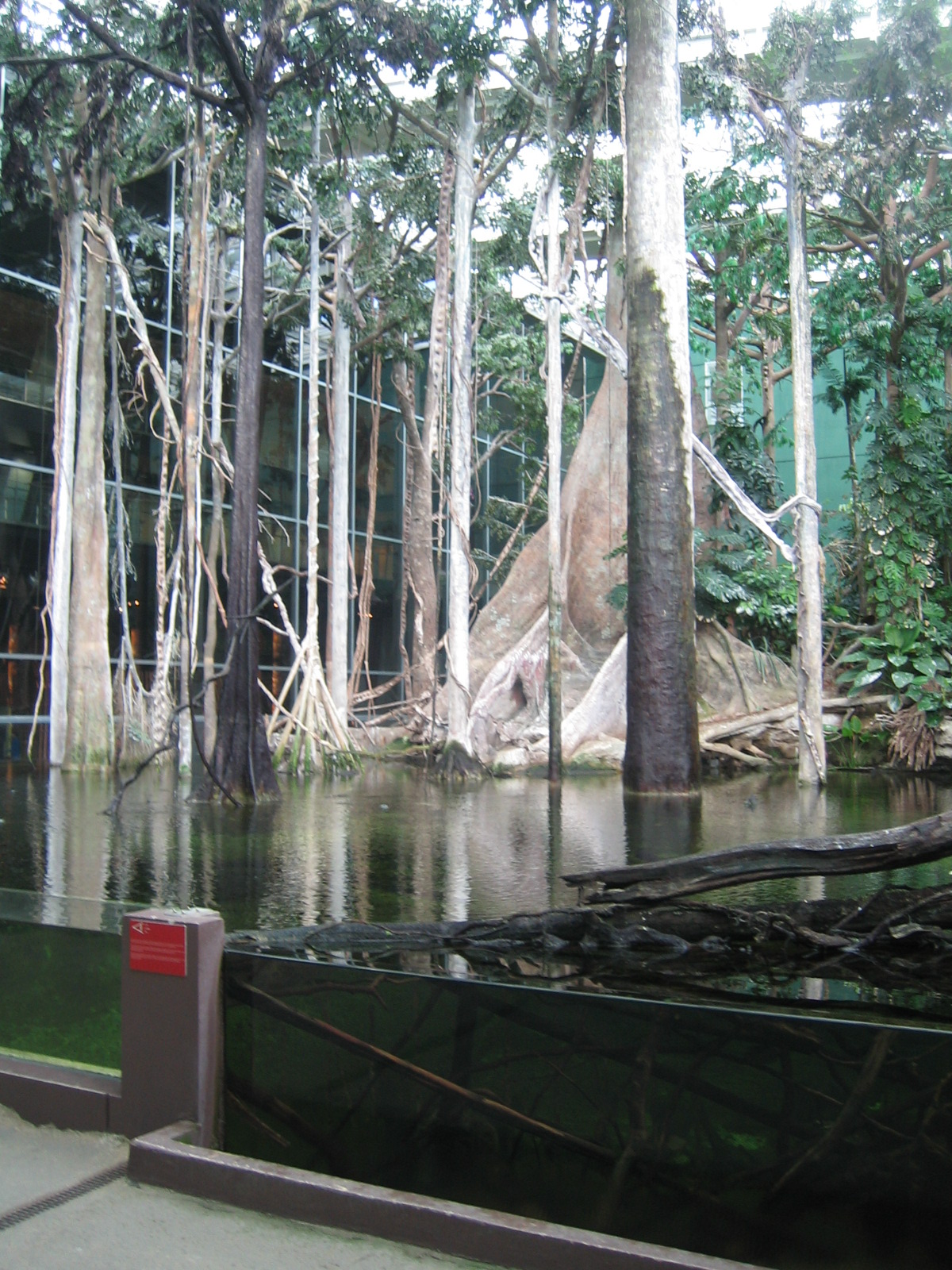
Flooded Forest exhibition

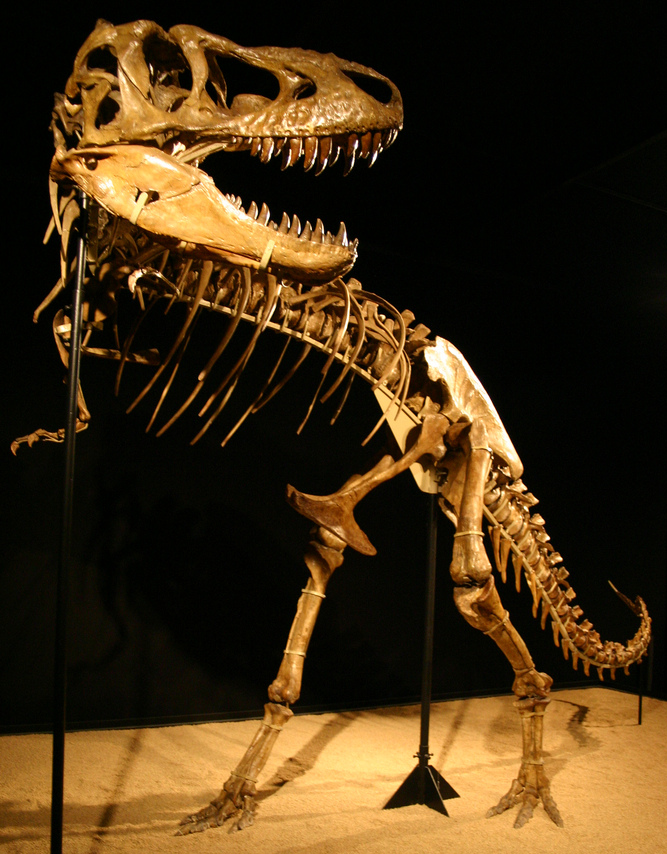
Tarbosaurus

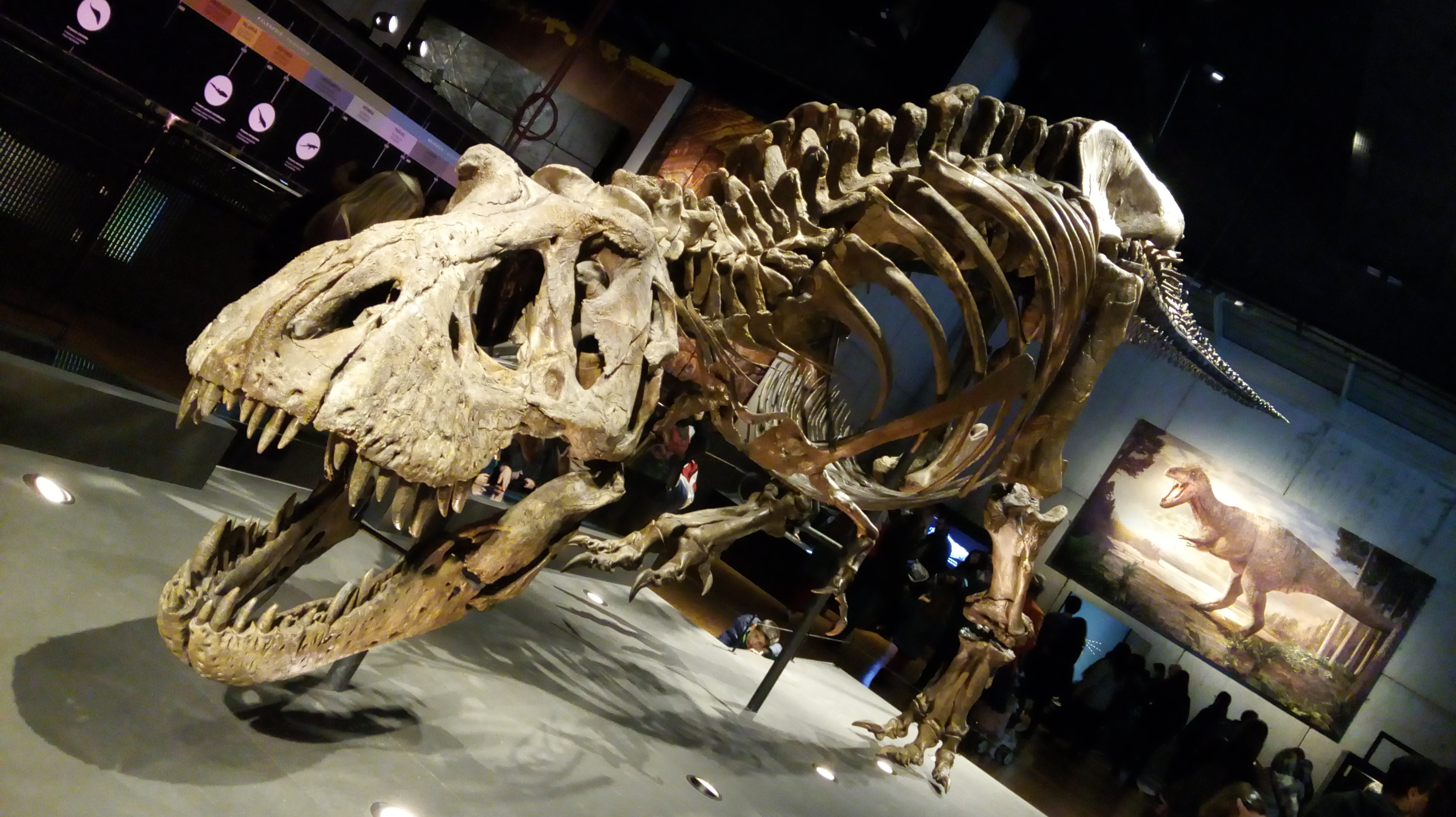
Tyrannosaurus rex ("Trix" specimen, exhibited at CosmoCaixa from 27 October 2017 to 18 February 2018)

== See also ==
- CaixaForum Barcelona
- Museum of Natural Sciences of Barcelona
- Jorge Wagensberg Lubinski
