= Museum of Natural Sciences of Barcelona =

Natural history museum and botanical garden in Barcelona, Spain

- Museu de Ciències Naturals de Barcelona; Museo de Ciencias Naturales de Barcelona
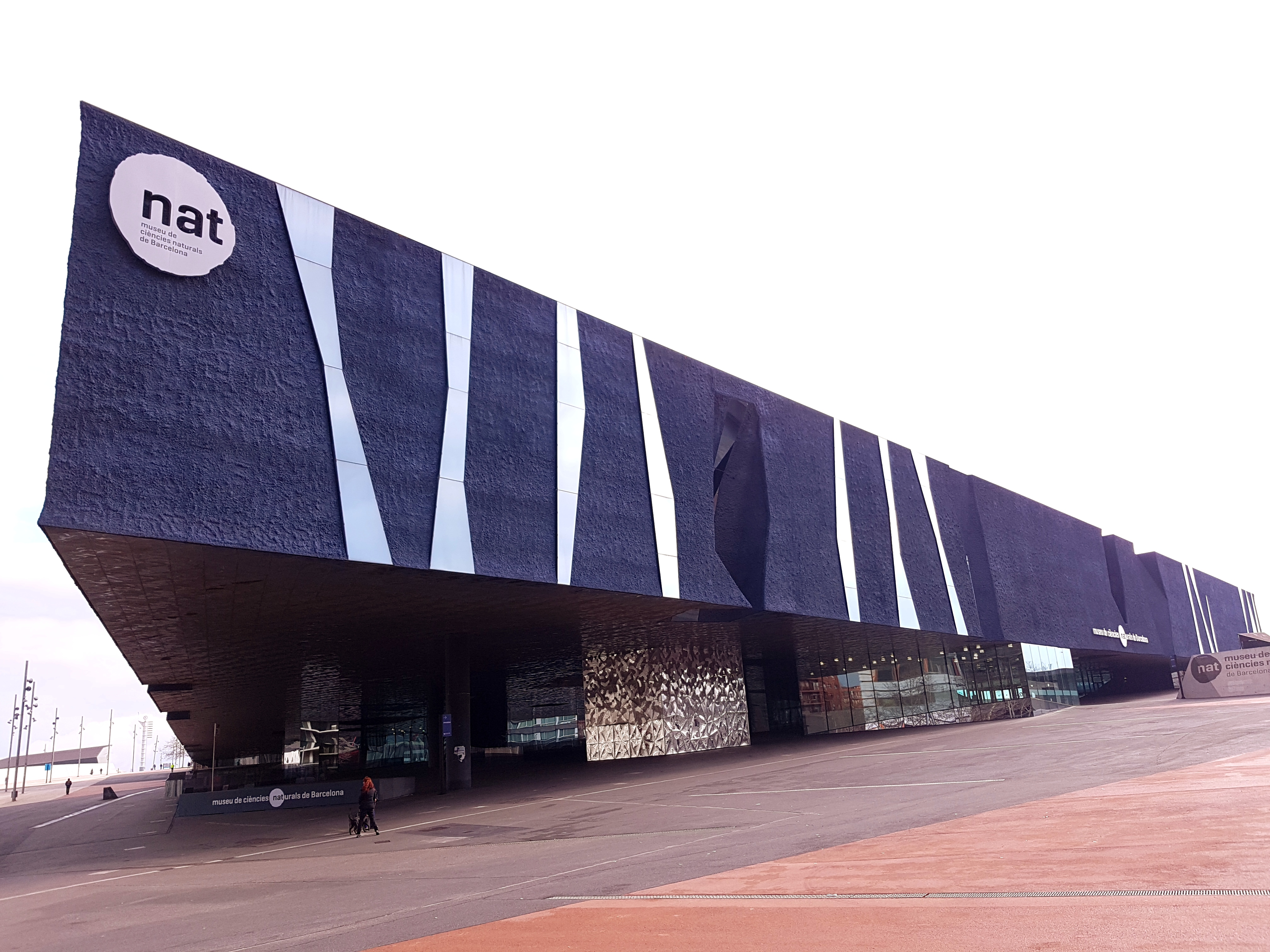
- A view on the Forum Building, one of the five seats of the museum
- Established: 1882
- Location: Barcelona, Spain
- Coordinates: 41.4111°N 2.2210°E
- Type: Natural history museum; Botanical garden
- Director: Carles Lalueza-Fox
- Website: museuciencies.cat

The Museum of Natural Sciences of Barcelona (in Catalan, Museu de Ciències Naturals de Barcelona; in Spanish, Museo de Ciencias Naturales de Barcelona) is a natural history museum in Barcelona, Catalonia, Spain. Founded in 1882 as the Martorell Museum, since 2011 it comprises four other locations: its main site at the Forum Building, the Historical Botanical Garden of Barcelona, the Botanical Garden of Barcelona, and the Laboratori de Natura.

== History ==
The museum was created in 1882 following the bequest, patronage and will and testament of a local business broker, Francesc Martorell Peña (1822–1878), who left on this purpose to the city of Barcelona his personal archaeological and natural history collections. At creation in 1882 the museum was named Museo Martorell de Arqueología y Ciencias Naturales (Spanish for "Martorell Museum of Archaeology and Natural Sciences") and was the first building in the history of Barcelona to be designed as a museum. Very soon, the archaeological, botanical and zoological collections were relocated elsewhere and the name was changed to Museo Martorell de Geología ("Martorell Museum of Geology"). Another building that is also located in the Parc de la Ciutadella, the nearby Castle of the Three Dragons, built in 1888 for the Barcelona Universal Exposition, was assigned to the Museum of Natural Sciences of Barcelona in 1917 and started exhibiting the zoological collections as of 1920.

Both buildings, the Geology Museum at the Martorell Museum and the Zoology Museum at the Castle of the Three Dragons, closed their doors to the public in 2010, although they still belong to the same institution, the Museum of Natural Sciences. In the meantime, the two main botanical gardens of the city, the Historical Botanical Garden of Barcelona (founded 1930) and the Botanical Garden of Barcelona (founded 1999), joined the museum in 2008. In 2010, the Forum Building was also assigned to the museum. It is intended to show to the public the main permanent exhibition of the institution, which opened to the public in March 2011. At first called el Museu Blau (Catalan for 'the Blue Museum'), the Forum Building changed its allocated function name to the official name of the institution (Museum of Natural Sciences of Barcelona) in December 2017.

== The museum in the present day ==
Since 2011, the merge of the above-mentioned entities reached the number of five different sites, all of them recognised as official seats by the museum:

- The Martorell Museum, the original seat of the Museum of Natural Sciences, built in 1882. The building was closed to the public between 2010 and 2023.
- The Laboratori de Natura ('Nature Laboratory'), at the Castle of the Three Dragons, which hosted the Zoology Museum between 1920 and 2010. This building is closed to the public since 2010.
- The Historical Botanical Garden of Barcelona, sited in Montjuïc, founded 1930, joined the Museum of Natural Sciences in 2008.
- The Botanical garden of Barcelona, also sited in Montjuïc, founded 1999, joined the Museum of Natural Sciences in 2008.
- The museum that is properly called "Museum of Natural Sciences of Barcelona", at the Forum Building, erected in 2004. When inaugurated in 2011, this museum was named el Museu Blau (Catalan for 'the Blue Museum') but changed to its current name in December 2017.

== See also ==
- CosmoCaixa Barcelona
