= Jordi Llompart =

Spanish journalist and film producer, director and writer

- Born: Jordi Llompart Mallorquès; October 11, 1962 (age 63); Barcelona, Catalonia, Spain
- Education: Autonomous University of Barcelona
- Occupations: Journalist writer film director screenwriter film producer
- Years active: 1983–present
- Notable work: (2005) Mystery of the Nile (2010) Magic Journey to Africa (2015) Barça Dreams

Jordi Llompart Mallorquès (born October 11, 1962) is a Spanish journalist and film producer, director and writer. He directed and presented many Radio and TV shows, mainly as anchorman on news, and he also produced and directed several films and documentary series for cinema and television including innovative projects for IMAX and stereoscopic 3D cinema.

Between 1988 and 2000 was director and presenter in television news in the main channel of Televisió de Catalunya TV3, as well as director and presenter of weekly news programs like Versió directa or Fem empresa, and he also created and directed the documentary series on the conservation of world cultural heritage L’oblit del passat (The Vanishing Past).

Among many works, as a filmmaker Llompart has produced, written and directed Mystery of the Nile (2005), the first movie produced by a Spanish company for the IMAX theaters, and he has also produced, written and directed Magic Journey to Africa (2010), the first european fiction movie for IMAX, Digital Cinemas and TV entirely shot and produced in stereoscopic 3D. In October 2009 he was awarded with the "Maria" Honorary Award in the 42nd edition of Sitges Film Festival.

== Early career ==
Llompart began his professional career in journalism in 1983 as director of the local radio station Radio Cubelles, and months later, and for three years, as editor and presenter of News programs in Radio Avui Cadena 13 in Barcelona. In 1987 joined the Catalonia public station Catalunya Ràdio and in January 1988 started to present the daily Evening News in Televisió de Catalunya (TV3). From 1988 to 2000 he worked as anchorman in several TV3 news programs like TN vespre and TN cap de setmana. He also directed and presented the debates and interviews show Versió directa and the economics program Fem empresa. Between 1994 and 1996 he also created, produced and directed for Televisió de Catalunya the 13-episode documentary series about the conservation of the cultural heritage of humanity titled L’oblit del passat (The Vanishing Past) filmed in the Mediterranean basin, North Africa and Near East. Between 2000 and 2001 he directed and presented in Catalunya Ràdio the economics program Economia i empresa (Economy and Business).

== Film career ==
In 2000 Llompart left Televisió de Catalunya to create, jointly with the venture capital society Barcelona Emprèn and also later with the investment society Invercartera, the audiovisual production company Orbita Max, from where he produced and directed several films, documentary series and innovative projects for IMAX theaters and cinemas in 2D and 3D. Between 2002 and 2004, among others, he produced and directed Nomads of the Human Condition, a 13-episode TV series that explores the human aspects of globalization through the eyes and experiences of present nomads like the Dalai Lama or the photographer Steve Mc Curry, Adventure on the Nile that narrates the four months trip adventure along the Nile river, and also Asha, Daughter of the Ganges, based on the Asha Miro's experience as an orphan girl adopted by a Catalan family who travels to India searching for her origins.

In 2005 Llompart produced and directed Mystery of the Nile, the first Spanish production for the IMAX theaters, made in co-production with the American company MacGillivray Freeman Films. The movie narrates the first expedition ever that successfully completes the epic descent along the Blue Nile river from source to see. Among several awards and recognitions, the film won the GSCA awards (2005) for Best Photography, Best Soundtrack and Best Production Achievement. It was the most viewed and highest grossing Large Format Film of that year, and the following year, in 2006, won the Jury prize and the public and youth prize in La Geode (Paris) Large Format film festival.

In October 2006, the publishing group RBA Holding Editorial entered to shareholding of Orbita Max with the 50% of the shares, having acquired the shares of the old financial partners. In 2007, Orbita Max received the Sant Jordi Cinematography Award for the most innovative audiovisual company, and in 2008 was distinguished with the FICOD Award granted by the Spanish Ministry of Industry for its career producing innovative projects as the first Large Format film in 2D and stereoscopic 3D for all cinema screens.

In 2009 Llompart produced and directed Journey to Arabia, a four-episode series that chronicles the expedition of two adventurers who set out to cross the entire Arabian Peninsula, with the world's most inhospitable desert, to explain the common roots of a civilization born of ancestral nomadic traditions.

In 2010 Llompart took to the screens Magic Journey to Africa, the first Spanish film production entirely made in stereoscopic 3D for Large Format Cinemas, Digital Cinemas and Television. The movie was inspired in the children's book written by himself dedicated to his daughter Jana deceased at the age of 7 in a tragic accident in Namibia, "The Heart on the Sand", a touching tale where Jana travels to Africa in dreams to discover love and magic. The movie was shot in many locations of Namibia, South Africa and Barcelona, Spain, starring the kids Eva Gerretsen (Jana), Michael Van Wyk (Kabbo) and Raymond Mvula (Mel) as well as the adults Verónica Blume, Adrià Collado and the actress and singer Leonor Watling. According to Llompart, it's "a movie made by children for children that claims naivety and invites the viewer to travel to Africa through this magical tale with a philosophical background about life and death". The film won the Gaudi Award 2011 for Best Visual Effects, and Jordi Llompart won the "Maria" Honorary Award in the 42nd Sitges International Film Festival in recognition for the creative and technical development of Large Format and 3D cinema. The film was recommended by the Spanish Ministry of Culture for its educational content and received a special recognition by the European Observatory for Children's Television (OETI).

Between 2010 and 2011 Llompart came back briefly to the Television directing and presenting the show El Debat de BTV in Barcelona Televisió. Next year, in 2012, produced and directed The End of the Big Cats a documentary series about the dangers that threaten the survival of lions, cheetahs and leopards, entirely shot in Namibia. This series was the last one he made with Orbita Max. The company, burdened by the economic crisis in the last years, went to bankruptcy in 2016. Beginning 2018, with the final extinction of Orbita Max, Llompart's relationship with the production company ended.

From 2012 to 2015 Llompart worked as executive producer, director and scriptwriter of Barça Dreams (2015) a long length documentary film about the history of Football Club Barcelona from its beginnings to the last triumphal age led by the player Lionel Messi, and the coaches Johan Cruyff, Pep Guardiola, Tito Vilanova and Luis Enrique.

In 2017 Llompart wrote and directed The Last Wild, a conservationist film that explains the need to preserve the wildlife not only to ensure the survival of the animals but also to provide a record of the powerful ancestral bond between humans and nature. In 2018 and 2019 wrote and directed documentary films for the Aga Khan Trust for Culture, as The World of the Fatimids, shot in Cairo and based on the Fatimid dynasty, and Restoring Dignity that is about the efforts to improve people's life, to restore their dignity, thanks to humanitarian and cultural projects implemented in Kabul, Afghanistan, Lahore, Pakistan and Delhi, India.

In 2021, Jordi Llompart was elected president of the Associació Societat Geogràfica de Catalunya (Geographic Society Association of Catalonia). This association, also known as Societat Nova Geogràfica, was founded in 2019 by Llompart himself and other renowned professionals from various fields of Catalan society with the aim of promoting knowledge of human, cultural and environmental geography.

In 2023, he produced and directed the documentary film Simfonia per un mon nou, an experimental documentary without voiceover narration and with music by the composer, Roger Subirana, that reflects on the state of the world and the contradictions of human civilization.

In 2025, Jordi Llompart produced and directed the documentary Angola - The Soul of Africa, a large-format IMAX blockbuster commissioned by the new Luanda Science Center. The documentary delves into the cultural diversity of the country, from the Namib Desert to the Kalandula Falls.

In 2026, he adapted the previous documentary for distribution to cinemas, television and digital platforms under the title Descobrint Angola.

== Books ==
- L'oblit del passat (1999) ISBN 9788441309098
- Seres y Estrellas (2000), along with Jorge Wagensberg, Eudald Carbonell and Eduard Salvador ISBN 8422684411
- El cor damunt la sorra (2006) ISBN 9788424647919
- Viatge màgic a l'Àfrica (2009) ISBN 9788493660185

== Filmography ==
Year	Title	As			Description
Year	Title	Screenwriter	director	Producer	Description
1996	The Vanishing Past	Yes	Yes		Series (13 episodes)
2002	Nomads of the Human Condition	Yes	Yes	Yes	Series (13 episodes)
2003	Asha, Daughter of Ganges	Yes	Yes	Yes	TV documentary
2004	Adventure on the Nile	Yes	Yes	Yes	TV documentary
2005	Mystery of the Nile	Yes	Yes	Yes	Film IMAX
2005	The Nomad Experience	Yes	Yes	Yes	TV documentary
2009	Arabia	Yes	Yes	Yes	Series (4 episodes)
2010	Magic Journey to Africa	Yes	Yes	Yes	Film IMAX, cinema and TV. 2D and 3D
2012	The End of the Big Cats	Yes	Yes	Yes	Series (4 episodes)
2015	Barça Dreams	Yes	Yes		Documentary cinema and TV. 2D and 3D
2017	The Last Wild	Yes	Yes		Documentary cinema and TV
2018	The World of the Fatimids	Yes	Yes		TV documentary
2019	Restoring Dignity	Yes	Yes		TV documentary
2023	Simfonia per un món nou	Yes	Yes	Yes	Music documentary
2024	Angola - The Soul of Africa	Yes	Yes	Yes	Documentary IMAX
2025	Descobrint Angola	Yes	Yes	Yes	TV Documentary
