= Forum Building =

Architectural landmark in Barcelona, Spain

Coordinates: 41°24′40″N 2°13′14.20″E

Forum Building

The Forum Building (Catalan: Edifici Fòrum, IPA: [əðiˈfisi ˈfɔɾum]; Spanish: Edificio Fórum), is an architectural landmark in Barcelona designed by the Swiss architects Jacques Herzog and Pierre de Meuron (Herzog & de Meuron).

The building is triangular in shape, measuring 180 metres on each side and 25 metres in height, located within the triangle formed by Diagonal Avenue, Rambla de Prim and the Ronda Litoral.

It was the symbol of the controversial 2004 Universal Forum of Cultures and the serious flaws that arose during its construction were widely covered in both the Spanish national and foreign press. The building has become a political bone of contention, with the opposition parties in both Barcelona Council and the Parliament of Catalonia demanding to know why it cost so much (of the order of US $144 m).

The building has an auditorium with a seating capacity of 3,200 and an exhibition hall covering nearly 5,000 square metres.

Since 2011 the building hosts the Museum of Natural Sciences of Barcelona (in Catalan, Museu de Ciències Naturals de Barcelona). During its first six years of existence, from 2011 to 2017, this museum was named Museu Blau (Catalan for "Blue Museum") but in 2017, changed its name to Museu de Ciències Naturals de Barcelona.

== Gallery ==
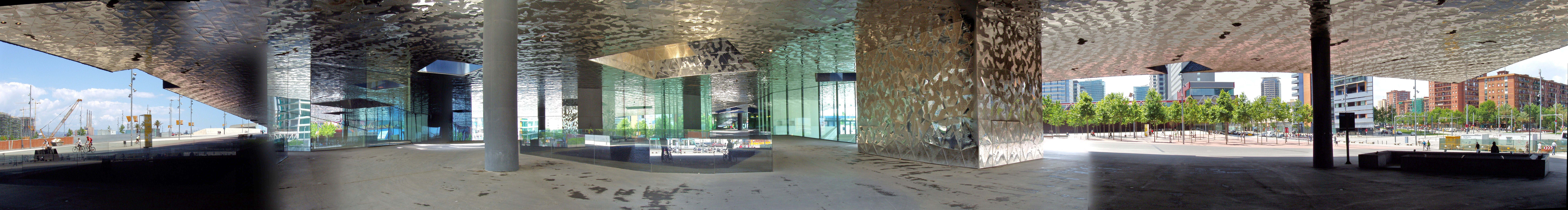
Inside

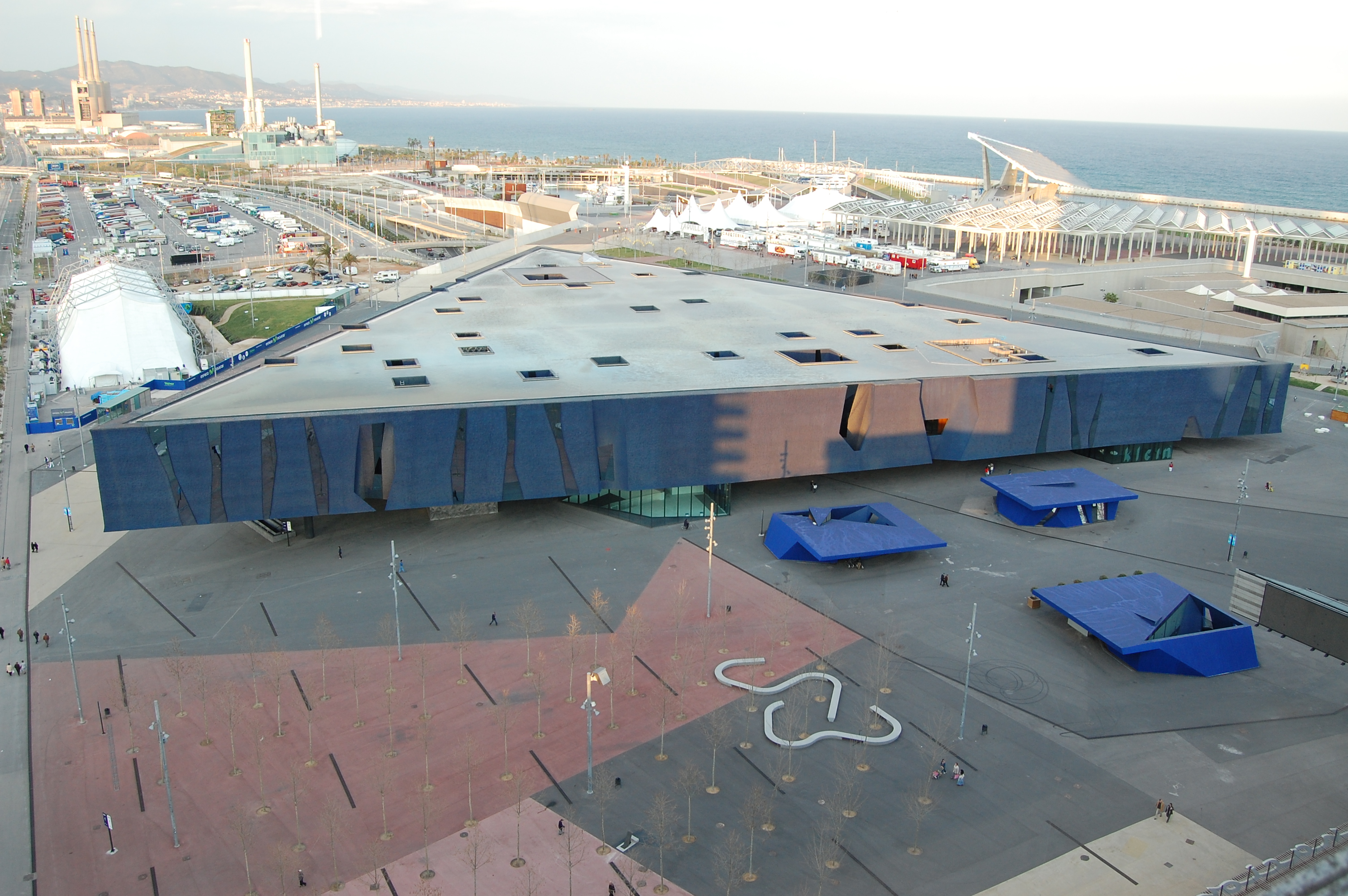
Aerial view

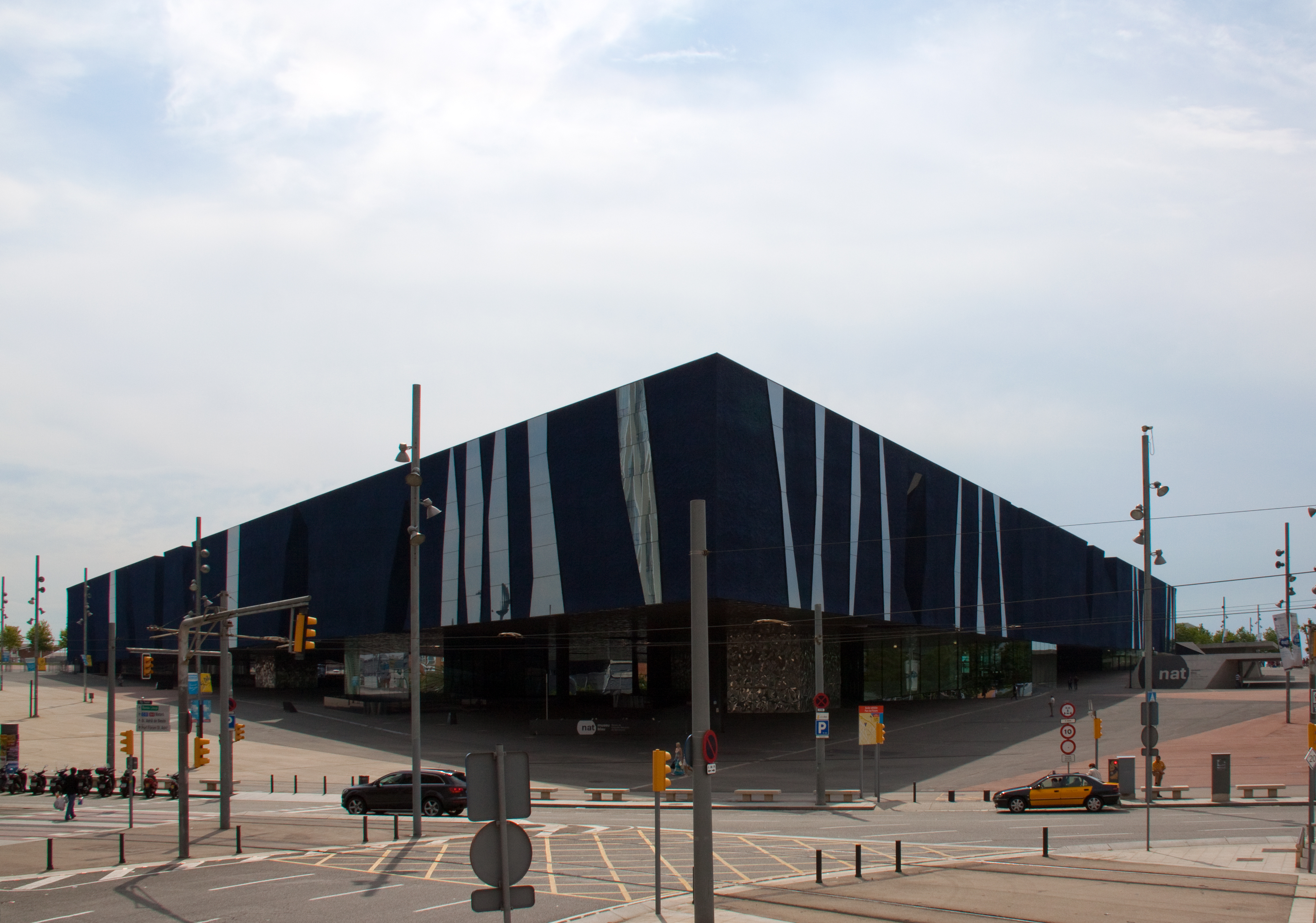
Angle.

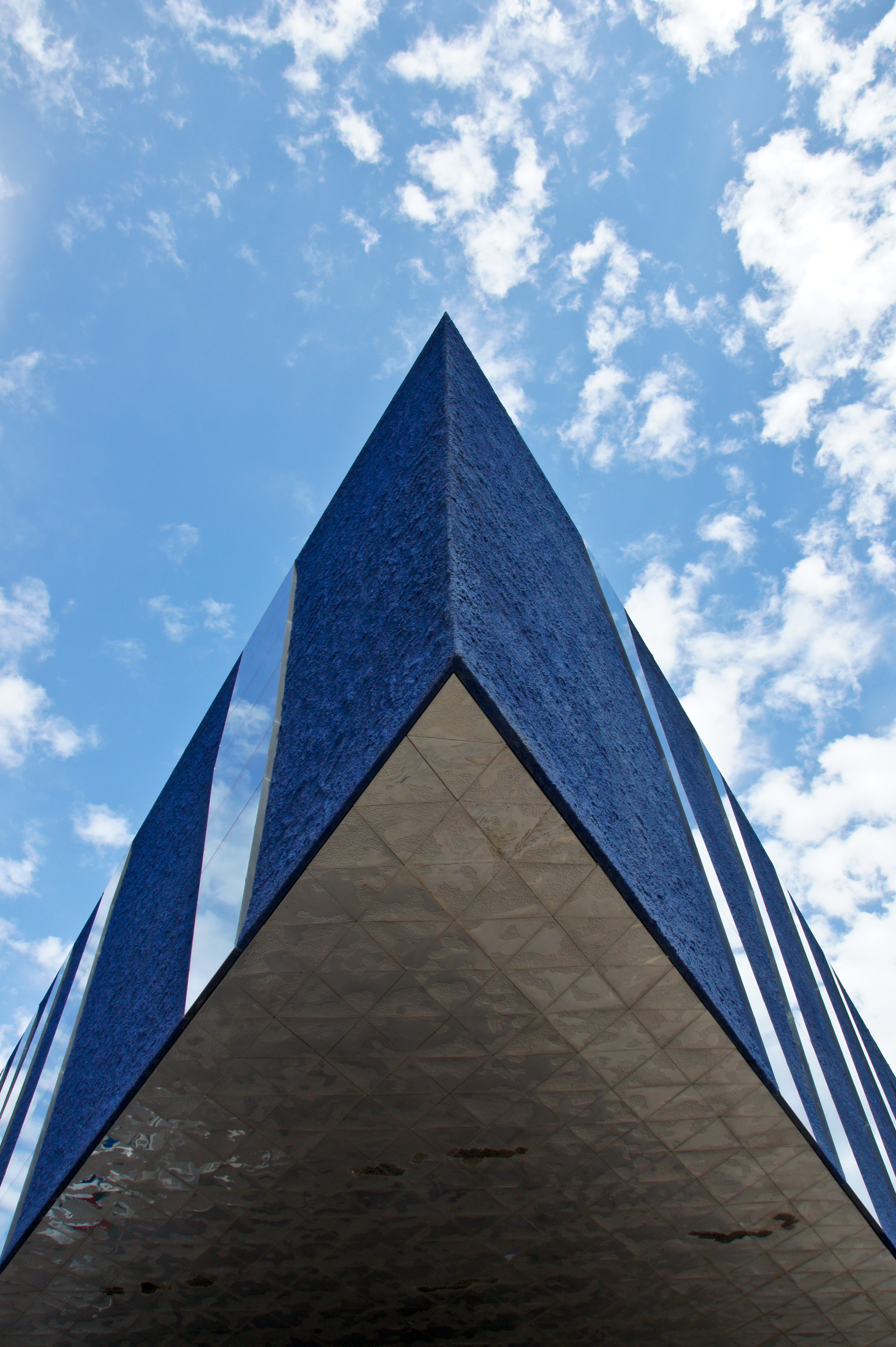
Angle

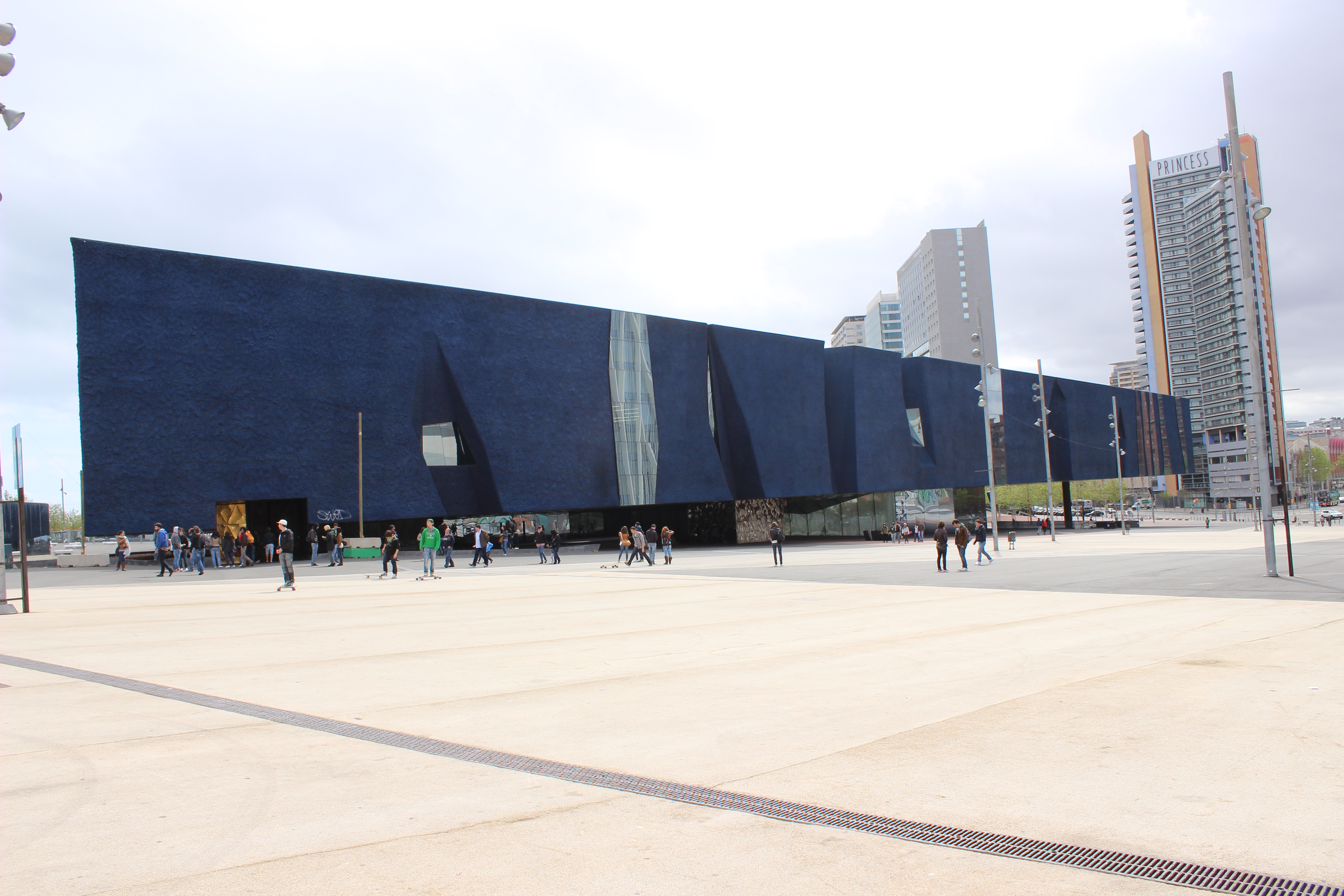
Side

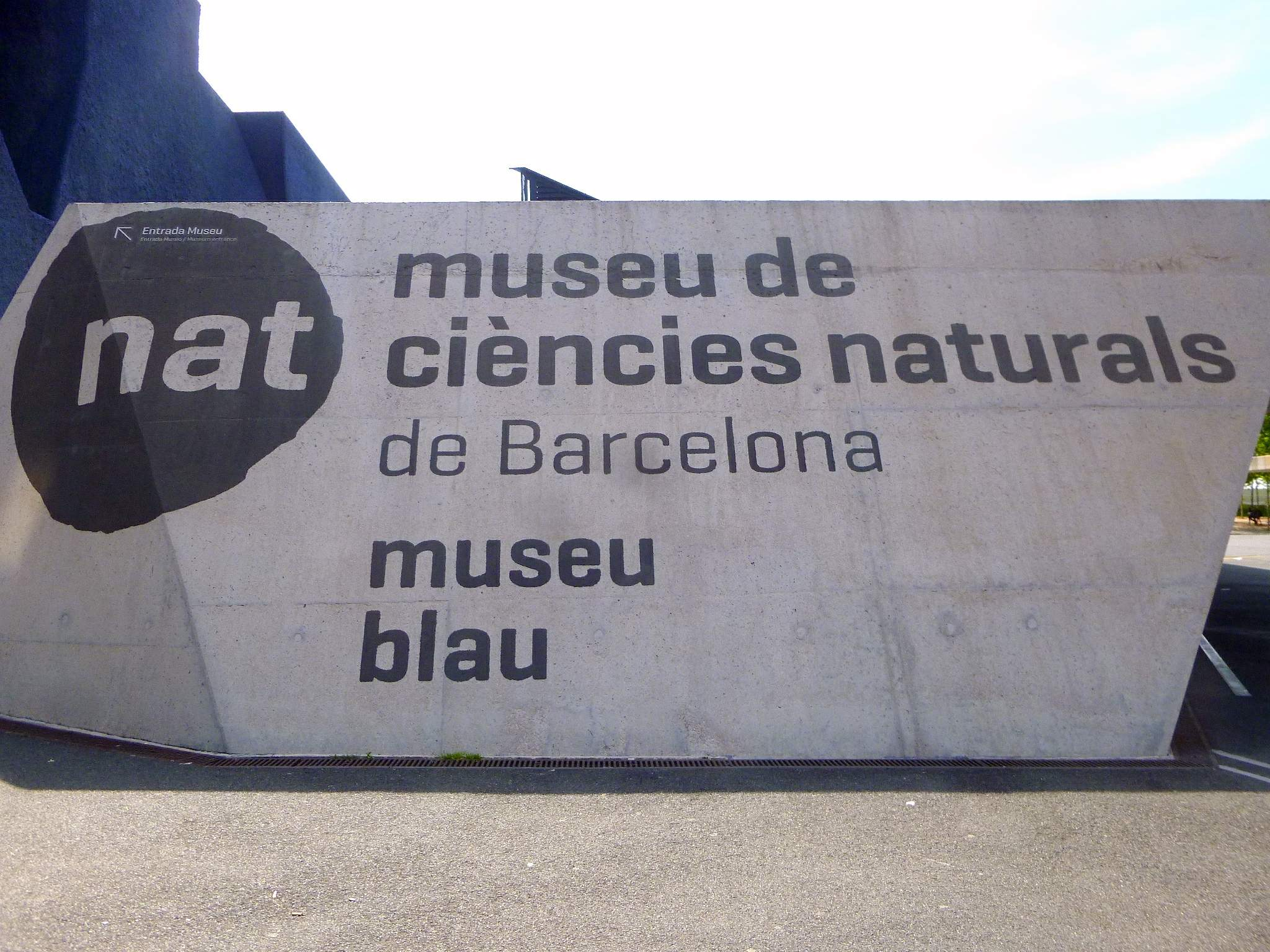

== See also ==
- Herzog & de Meuron
- 2004 Universal Forum of Cultures
- 40th Goya Awards
