= Jorge Wagensberg Lubinski =

Spanish writer, researcher, and professor (1948–2018)

Jorge Wagensberg
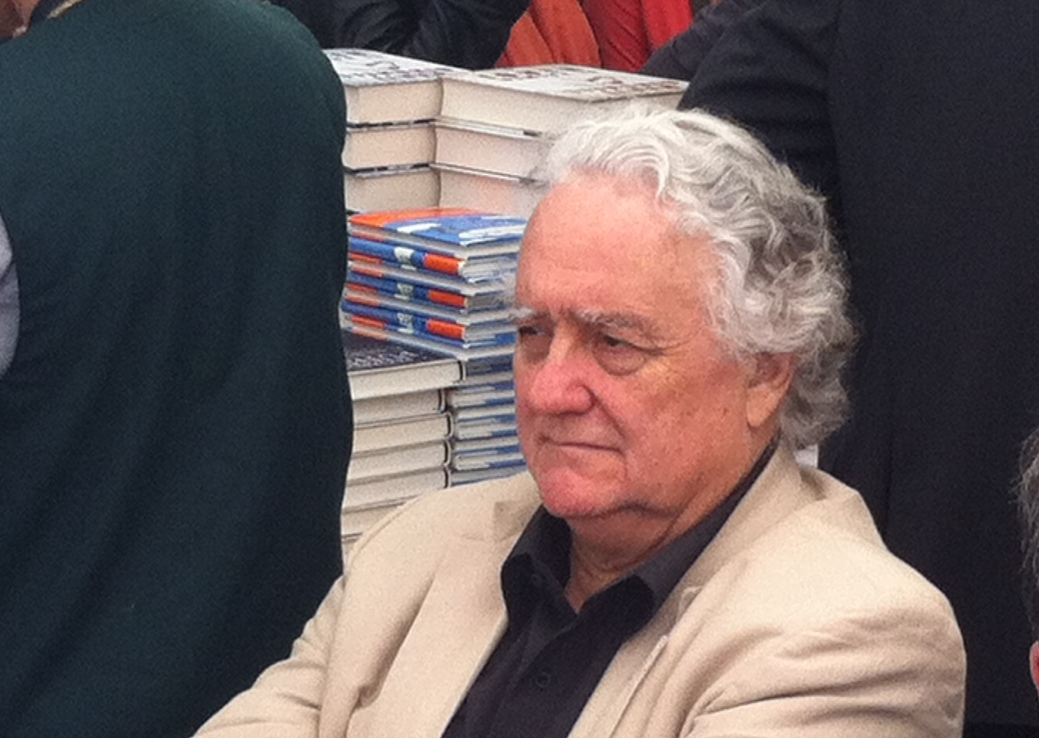
- Wagensberg in 2014
- Born: 2 December 1948; Barcelona, Catalonia, Spain
- Died: 3 March 2018 (aged 69); Barcelona, Spain
- Education: University of Barcelona
- Known for: Writer, academic, physicist and researcher
- Awards: Juan Mari Arzak Award (UB, 2003); National Prize for Scientific Thought and Culture (2005); Creu de Sant Jordi (2007); Doctor Honoris Causa by the University of Lleida
- Scientific career
- Fields: Physics
- Workplaces: University of Barcelona (1981-2016); Danube University Krems

Jorge Wagensberg Lubinski (2 December 1948 – 3 March 2018), was a Spanish professor, researcher and writer.

Graduate (1971) and PhD (1976) in Physics with extraordinary prize from the University of Barcelona, where he was Professor of Theory of Irreversible Processes and Statistical mechanics in the Faculty of Physics from 1981 to 2016. He was also a visiting professor at Danube University Krems (Austria).

Wagensberg was one of the scientific disseminators in Spain as an editor, lecturer, writer and museologist.

He created and directed between 1991 and 2005 the Science Museum of the "la Caixa" Foundation in Barcelona, also leading the renewal of the same that culminated in 2004 in what is now called CosmoCaixa, with headquarters in Barcelona and Madrid. In 2005, the Generalitat de Catalunya awarded him the National Prize for Scientific Thought and Culture for his work imagining and creating the new Cosmocaixa. He remained the scientific director of the la Caixa Foundation until 2014.

As a scientist, Wagensberg made contributions to the production of scientific thought, in different fields, such as: thermodynamics of non-equilibrium, thermodynamics of microbiological crops, Monte Carlo method, theoretical biology, entomology, taphonomy, philosophy of science and scientific museology in specialized journals such as Journal of Nonequilibrium Thermodynamics, Physics A, American Journal of Physics, The Journal of Physics and Chemistry of Solids, Journal of Theoretical Biology, Bulletin of Mathematical Biology, Proceedings of the National Academy of Sciences of the United States of America (PNAS), Scandinavian Entomology, Beiträge zur Entomologie, Biology and Philosophy, Biological Theory, Computer Applications in the Biosciences (CABIOS), Museum Practice or ECSITE News Letters.

He was president of the European Collaborative for Science & Technology (ECSITE) between 1993 and 1995 and, in 2010, he was a founding member of the European Museum Academy (EMA). He collaborated regularly in the magazine Mètode and in the newspapers El País and El Periódico.

He was the author of journalistic essays, a score of books and a hundred research papers on thermodynamics, mathematics, biophysics, microbiology, paleontology, entomology, scientific museology and philosophy of science. In April 2014 he published a work in the journal on cognition and evolution Biological Theory, of the Konrad Lorenz Institute in Austria, on the essence of the scientific method: "On the Existence and Uniqueness of the Scientific Method" (2014), vol.9 ( 3), pp 331–346.

In 1983 he founded the book collection "Metatemas", of which he was editor since then. The collection, dedicated to scientific thought, has published more than a hundred titles by authors such as: Erwin Schrödinger, Albert Einstein, Konrad Lorenz, Richard Feynman, Stephen Jay Gould, Jacques Monod, François Jacob, Norbert Wiener, Murray Gell-Mann, Martin Gardner, Martin Rees, Richard Dawkins, Benoît Mandelbrot, Lynn Margulis, Douglas Hofstadter, Sheldon Glashow, René Thom and Wagensberg himself, among others. On its 30th anniversary the collection exceeds the 130 titles published.

He was the author of numerous aphorisms, published in newspapers (especially in El País) and in compilation books, such as Más árboles que ramas (Tusquets, 2012).
