= Jardí Botànic de Barcelona =

Botanical garden in Barcelona, Spain

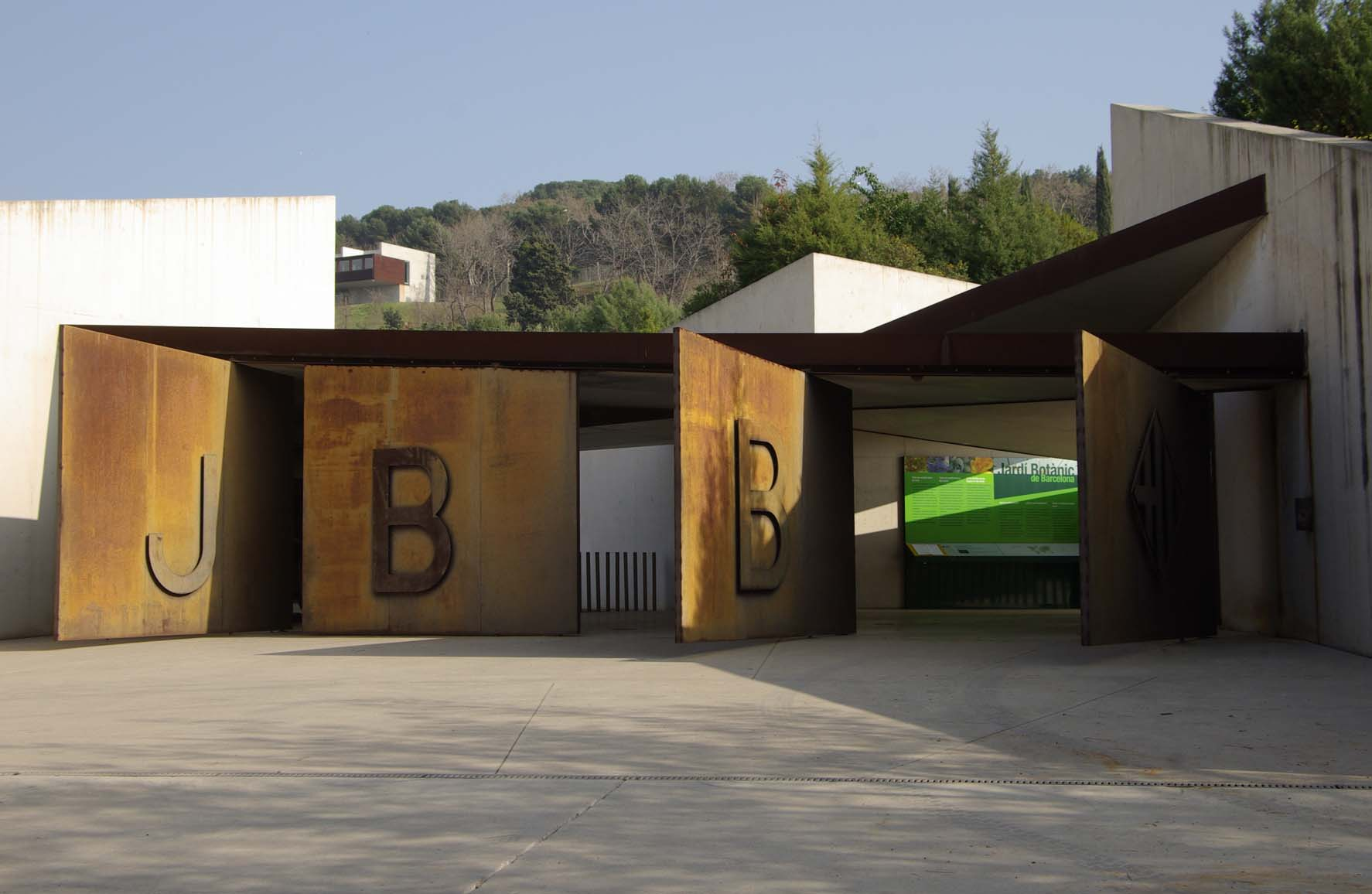
- Main Entrance
- Interactive map of Jardí Botànic de Barcelona
- Type: Botanical Garden
- Location: Montjuïc hill, Barcelona
- Coordinates: 41.3618°N 2.1587°E
- Created: 1888

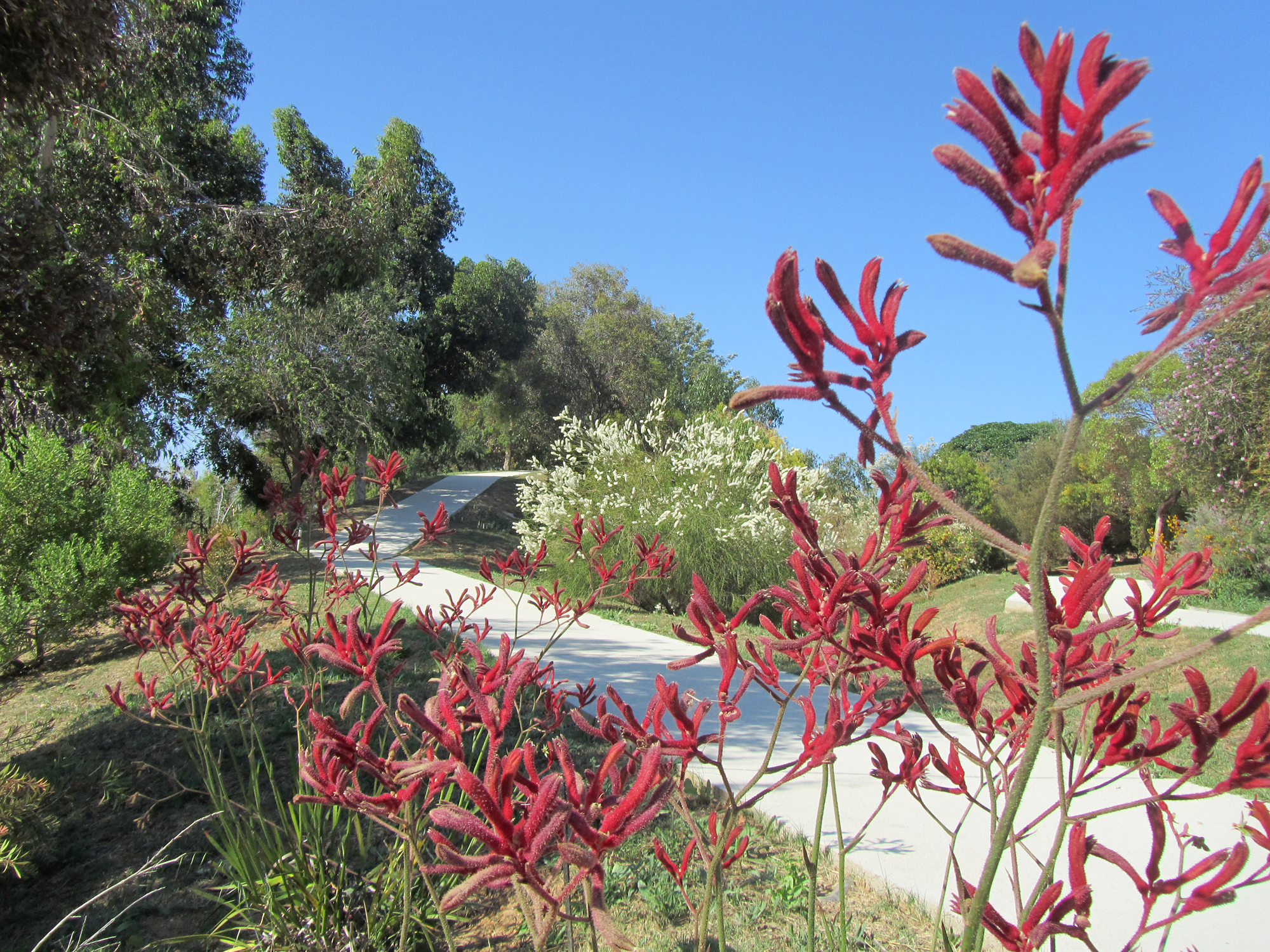
Anigozanthos flavidus cv. at Jardí Botànic de Barcelona

The Botanical Garden of Barcelona (Catalan: Jardí Botànic de Barcelona, IPA: [ʒəɾˈði βuˈtaniɡ də βəɾsəˈlonə]) is a botanical garden in the Montjuïc hill of Barcelona set amongst a number of stadiums used in the Summer Olympic Games of 1992. Although a botanical garden had been established in Barcelona as early as 1888, the current gardens date from 1999. It should not be confused with the Historical Botanical Garden of Barcelona (Catalan: Jardí Botànic Històric) founded in 1930 and reopened in 2003, also located in Montjuïc. Both botanical gardens, the Historical Botanical Garden of Barcelona and the Botanical Garden of Barcelona, are administrated by the Botanical Institute of Barcelona (Catalan: Institut Botànic de Barcelona), which is one of the four institutions that constitute the Museum of Natural Sciences of Barcelona.

The gardens specialise in plants and communities from those areas of the world with Mediterranean climates and is divided into areas representing the main areas. These are Australia, Chile, California, South Africa, the western Mediterranean area and the eastern Mediterranean area. A specific section is devoted to the flora of the Canary Islands.

The garden was designed by local landscape architect Bet Figueras.

== See also ==
- Parks and gardens of Barcelona
