= List of parks and gardens of Barcelona =

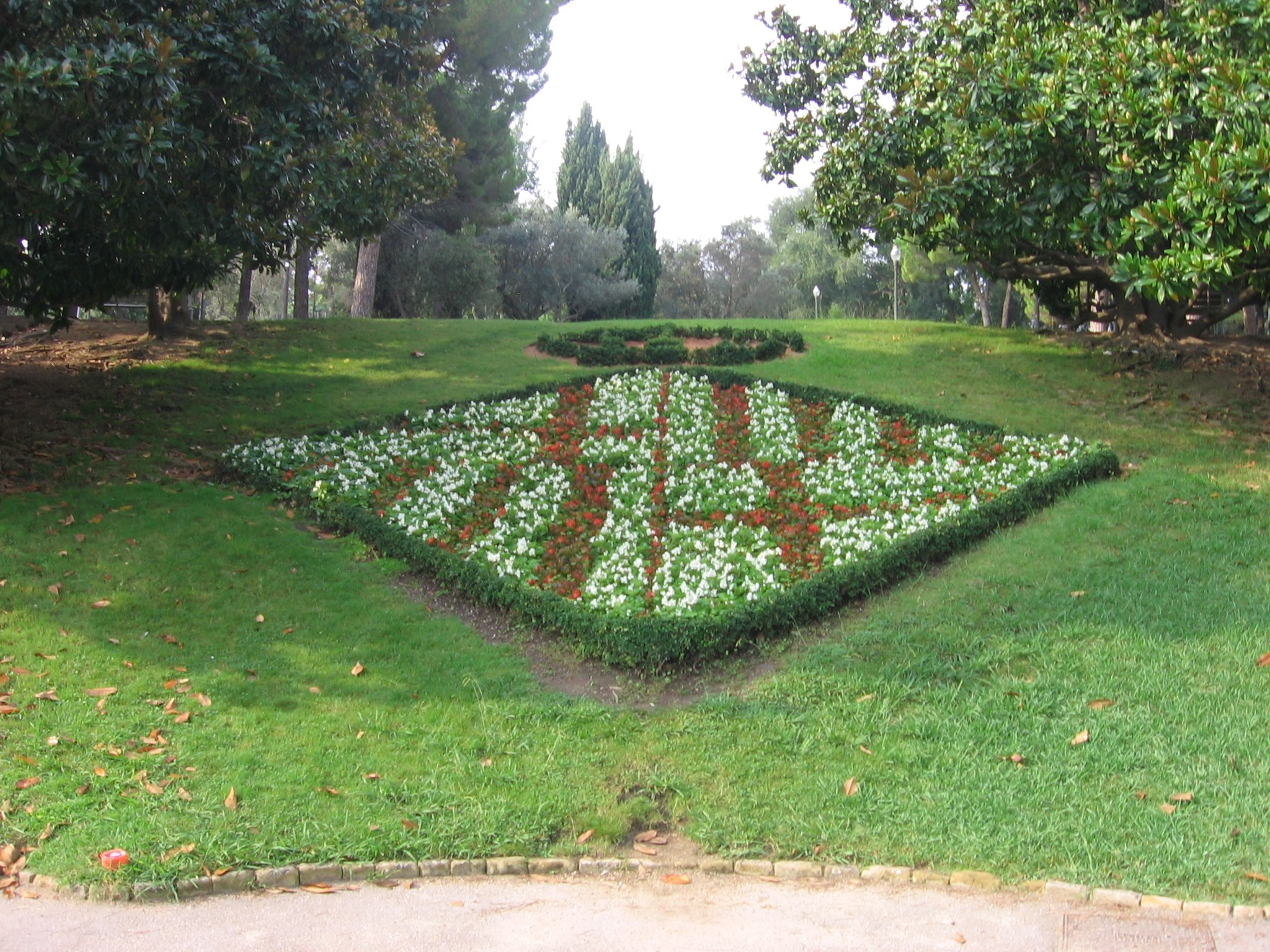
Floral arrangement with the coat of arms of Barcelona, gardens of Mossèn Cinto Verdaguer.

The parks and gardens of Barcelona cover an area of 2,784 hectares. (Note: Of the total 2784 hectares, 1795 correspond to the Sierra de Collserola, and the rest to green areas, including public parks and gardens, roadside trees (150,912 units), planters (3,816 units), flower beds and slopes; also included are the 6 hectares corresponding to the beaches of Barcelona (2001 data) (AA.VV., 2001, p. 31).) Its management depends on the Municipal Institute of Parks and Gardens of Barcelona (in Catalan: Institut Municipal de Parcs i Jardins de Barcelona), a body under the Barcelona City Council. Since the 19th century —and especially in the 20th century— Barcelona has been committed to the development of green areas in the city, and is currently one of the European cities with the most roadside trees (150,000 units). In 2001 the Institute of Parks and Gardens received ISO 14001 certification for the conservation and management of green spaces and public roadside trees.

Gardening in Barcelona has had an uneven evolution over time: the first significant project, the Labyrinth of Horta park, dates back to the 18th century; the first large public park in Barcelona, the Citadel, was opened in the 19th century; but most of the green areas in the city date from the 20th century, a period in which public gardening in the Catalan capital was given a great boost. In this last century gardening has developed mainly in four phases: the first planning carried out by Léon Jaussely in his plan of connections and by Nicolau Maria Rubió i Tudurí, author of an ambitious plan of concentric green areas throughout the city, from Montjuïc to the Besòs; the post-war period saw a setback in the creation of green spaces, mainly due to real estate speculation that led to an increase in the population due to immigration, as well as the priority given to road traffic due to the increase in the number of cars. With the arrival of democracy there was a new impulse to the creation of landscaped spaces, with a predominance of architectural design and a multipurpose sense of space, which added to the plant element service areas and leisure and recreational facilities for the population; finally, towards the end of the century a more naturalistic trend emerged, more in line with the new ideas of ecology and environmental sustainability, with concern not only for parks and large green areas but also for the placement of groves in streets and promenades of the city.

Depending on their characteristics, Barcelona's parks and gardens are divided into several typologies: "historical", those created before 1950, such as the Parc del Laberint d'Horta, the Parc de la Ciutadella, Parc Güell, the gardens of the University of Barcelona, those of Laribal and those of the Palau Reial de Pedralbes; "thematic", which are dedicated to a certain type of plant species, such as the Parc de Cervantes, dedicated to roses, the Mossèn Costa i Llobera gardens, specialized in cacti and succulents, and the Mossèn Cinto Verdaguer gardens, dedicated to aquatic, bulbous and rhizomatous plants; "urban" are the most common type, parks and gardens located in the city and open to all public, with services and multipurpose spaces for the enjoyment of all citizens; and "forest", green spaces of wide extension generally located in areas bordering the city, such as the Sierra de Collserola and the mountain of Montjuïc.

== List of parks and gardens ==
=== A ===
Year	Name	Area	Location	Description	Photo
1930	Acclimatization Garden of Barcelona	0,86 ha	Estadio Avenue s/n (Sants-Montjuic)	It is located on the mountain of Montjuic, between the Olympic Stadium and the Bernat Picornell Pools. It was created in 1930 by Nicolás María Rubió y Tudurí, the year after the 1929 Barcelona International Exposition, on the site where the Italian and Swedish pavilions had been located. Its objective was to create a special protection zone for the acclimatization of foreign species. The main nucleus was made up of species from the five continents that were brought for the exhibition, which were later expanded until 1937, when the Civil War interrupted the work. Later, in 1945, the architect Lluís Riudor and the botanist Joan Pañella resumed the planting work, which continued until the 1980s. This garden houses about 230 species of plants, some of them unique or of scarce presence in the city. Its area is divided into two levels, connected by stone stairs, and next to the flowerbeds are a series of pergolas with vines, connected by paths of sablon.	
2014	Àgora Juan Andrés Benítez	0,0662 ha	Carrer Aurora (El Raval)	It is an occupied, community-run garden, situated in the neighborhood of Raval, Barcelona. It is named after a resident of the neighborhood that was killed on October 6, 2013, by the Mossos d'Esquadra (Catalan police). Since 2014, when it was occupied it has hosted various events by at least 400 collectives.	Entrance to Àgora Juan Andrés Benítez
1978	Parc de les Aigües	1,95 ha	Alfonso X Square (Horta-Guinardó)	The origin of this park is found in the old gardens and nurseries of the residence of the president of the company Aigües de Barcelona, designed in the late 19th century by the Swiss gardener Nicolas Chevalier. The residence of the Aigüesvexecutive —known as Can Móra—, in neo-Mudejar style, is currently the headquarters of the district of Horta-Guinardó. The gardens were remodeled by Joaquim Casamor in 1978, who established a series of staggered areas to save the slope of the land, and laid out a central walkway populated with yuccas and palm trees, as well as a pine forest at the top, where a pool for irrigation is located, which protrudes from the ground in the style of the Catalan safareig ("washhouse"). In the upper part of the park is the Mercè Rodoreda Library, next to an esplanade where the sculpture El submarino enterrado, by Josep Maria Riera i Aragó (1991) is located. Among the vegetation, with 44 species of trees, stands out a tulipero de Virginia (Liriodendron tulipifera), declared of local interest.	
2018	Parc d'Antoni Santiburcio	1,2 ha	Gran de Sant Andreu Street n.º 484 (Sant Andreu)	Dedicated to the socialist politician Antoni Santiburcio Moreno, it was created on the former site of an artillery barracks. After its demolition, it was planned to create a green space next to various facilities for the neighborhood and social housing. The park was built in two phases: in the first, completed in 2018, various differentiated areas were delimited, such as an esplanade, a parterre of aromatic plants, a zone of trees, exercise areas and ornamental fountains, as well as a path that forms small squares and viewpoints. The vegetation incorporates a variety of shrubby plant species, with an irrigation system that incorporates sustainable drainage techniques to take advantage of rainfall. In 2020, in a second phase of the works, the children's play area was inaugurated, with a surface area of 6706 m^{2}.	

=== B ===
Year	Name	Area	Location	Description	Photo
1995	Jardins del Baix Guinardó	1,79 ha	Marina Street, 372 (Horta-Guinardó)	It is located in the old central courtyard of the Gerona Barracks, a former military cavalry barracks whose building is now occupied by municipal offices in the district of Horta-Guinardó. It was created in 1995 with a project by Jordi Farrando. The landscaped area is structured around a large square pond, which is the center of the park. Around it, there is a wide esplanade of sablon, and plant elements are combined with leisure areas (a children's area, a bar, a picnic area, ping-pong tables and a series of fitness equipment). On a slope of the terrain there are terraces with shrub species.	
1996	Parc de la Barceloneta	3,21 ha	Passeig Marítimo de la Barceloneta, 15-21 (Ciutat Vella)	It is located in the neighborhood of La Barceloneta. It was inaugurated in 1996, with a design by Jordi Henrich and Olga Tarrasó. On this site there was formerly a factory of the Catalana de Gas company, in operation until 1989, of which remain a water tower and the metal structure of a gasometer, designed by the engineer Claudi Gil Serra in 1868. The tower is a work of modernist design by Josep Domènech i Estapà, from 1905. The office building, built in 1907 by Domènech i Estapà, which now houses the Fábrica del Sol, headquarters of the Barcelona Sostenible Resource Center, dedicated to environmental education, is also preserved from the old factory. The park area comprises several areas with grassy parterres and sablon spaces, punctuated by plant areas dominated by regular plantings of trees such as pines, tipuanas, palms, bellasombras and taray trees. Next to the promenade, which overlooks the Barceloneta beach, there is a Monument to Simón Bolívar, a work by Julio Maragall (1996).	
2004	Parc Fluvial del Besòs	115 ha	Besòs	With a length of 9 km, this park runs along the course of the Besòs river from Montcada i Reixac —at the confluence with the Ripoll River—to the mouth of the river in Sant Adrià de Besòs, passing through the municipalities of Barcelona and Santa Coloma de Gramenet. There are ten bridges along its route: Moncada, B-20, Vell de Santa Coloma, Can Peixauet, Molinet, Guipúzcoa, A-19, Cristòfor de Moura, Ferrocarril and Maristany. The park is divided into three areas: a wetlands area, located in Moncada (first 3 km); another for public use (5 km), with 22 ha of lawns; and the river mouth (450 m), restricted to the public. It is managed by the Diputació de Barcelona. This area suffered from the 1960s a strong degradation due to industrial discharges into the river. Since the 1980s it has undergone environmental recovery, until it became a green space dedicated today to leisure and sports, in addition to the preservation of its natural habitat. The park is home to some two hundred species of birds, as well as other animals such as mice, weasels, turtles and frogs.	
1999	Jardí Botànic de Barcelona	14 ha	Doctor Font i Quer Street, s/n (Sants-Montjuic)	It is located on the mountain of Montjuic, and was created in 1999 with the aim of being the main botanical garden of the city, since the previous one —henceforth known as the Historical Botanical Garden— was of small dimensions. The authors of the project were Carlos Ferrater, Artur Bossy, Joan Pedrola and Bet Figueras. This garden was dedicated to Mediterranean climate species from all over the world, grouped in five phytogeographic zones: California, Chile, Australia and South Africa, in addition to the Mediterranean. There are also some homoclimatic species from China and Japan. In total, some 7,000 species are catalogued, grouped on triangular platforms arranged in terraces to overcome the unevenness of the terrain. The garden also has nursery areas, as well as a botanical laboratory, an auditorium, a library and a bar-restaurant. It also houses the Salvador Museum, which conserves 800,000 specimens of botanical species collected since the 17th century.	
1930	Jardí Botànic Històric de Barcelona	1,92 ha	Muntanyans Avenue (Sants-Montjuic)	This is the original botanical garden, which was replaced in 1999 by the new Botanical Garden; however, it can still be visited, and has the advantage of having the tallest trees in Barcelona. It was created in 1930 at the bottom of a quarry located behind the National Palace of Montjuic, with a great collection of exotic plants compiled by the botanist Pius Font i Quer. Due to the conditioning works of the Montjuic site for the 1992 Olympics, in 1986 its grounds were affected by several earthworks, which affected the stability of its surface and forced it to be closed to the public. It was reopened in 2003 after restoration work. Among the species preserved are plants from Catalonia, the Balearic Islands and the Pyrenees, as well as a group of medicinal plants. On its grounds is located a farmhouse built for the International Exposition of 1929.	

=== C ===
Year	Name	Area	Location	Description	Photo
1991	Jardins de Ca n'Altimira	0,43 ha	Mandri Street, 71 (Sarriá-Sant Gervasio)	The origin of these gardens is located in the homonymous estate, owned by Dr. Josep Altimira, at the time when Sant Gervasi de Cassoles was a village that had not yet been added to Barcelona. On the death of the doctor, the estate became the property of the Missionaries of the Immaculate Conception, who converted the building into a school. In the 1980s it became public property, and in 1991 it was opened to the public after a remodeling carried out by María Luisa Aguado. After accessing the main entrance on Mandri Street, the garden is lush with vegetation, especially the imposing presence of Aleppo pines. A stepped path descends to a lower level, where there is a sablon square with a fountain and, at the back, a hypostyle hall, formerly covered by trees and today by a basketball court. This area originally had grottoes and navigable water galleries, which unfortunately have been lost. Both levels are connected by two bridges, one of stone and the other of iron. In the upper part of the garden there is a children's area.	
1917-1923	Viver de Can Borni		Camino de Can Borni, 51-59 (Horta-Guinardó)	It is located on the Tibidabo mountain. The author of the project was the landscape architect Nicolás María Rubió y Tudurí, director of Parks and Gardens of Barcelona, who conceived it as an acclimatization garden for the 1929 Barcelona International Exposition. The design of the garden shows the influence of Hispano-Arabic gardening, as in other contemporary projects of the architect as the Laribal Gardens, which he designed in collaboration with Jean-Claude Nicolas Forestier. Thus, the terrain is structured in various terraces through which runs a water channel that flows from an upper pool, from a mountain spring. The vegetation consists mainly of Mediterranean species. The garden has a nature interpretation center. The nursery was restored in 2006.	
1989	Jardins de Can Castelló	0,37 ha	C/ Castelló, 1-7 (Sarriá-Sant Gervasio)	It was opened to the public in 1989 after a restoration carried out by Antoni Falcón. The name comes from the masia that was owned by Josep Castelló-Galvany i Quadras, now a home for the elderly. It is a romantic style garden, with paths and flowerbeds of curved shapes, marked with inlaid pebbles. The land is delimited by a high wall from the old estate, and access is through an entrance gate. Inside the enclosure is the building of the old masia, with the traditional Catalan ancestral architecture. The vegetation is exuberant, with trees of great size due to their age, among which palm trees and horse chestnut trees stand out.	
1993	Parc de Can Dragó	11,86 ha	Meridiana Avenue (Nou Barris)	It is considered a "sports park", since a large part of its land is used for sports facilities, such as a soccer field, a sports center, athletics tracks and indoor swimming pools, as well as a lake that serves as an outdoor swimming pool in summer, in addition to pétanque courts and children's playgrounds. In an environment degraded by heavy traffic, the park was built on a site that had previously belonged to RENFE, with a project by Enric Pericas in 1993. The vegetation is wild, without excessive manipulation, in the naturalist style, composed of groves, bushes and grassy areas. At the top of a small hill there is a sculpture with two chariots of horses led by Olympic charioteers, a replica of the work done by Pablo Gargallo for the Olympic Stadium of Montjuic. Also in the park is the monument to the victims of the 1987 Hipercor bombing, entitled Tall Irregular Progression, a work by Sol LeWitt (2003).	
2012	Parc de Can Rigal	2 ha	Albert Bastardas Avenue / Carlos Ferrer Salat Street (Les Corts)	The area of the park is shared by Barcelona and the Hospitalet de Llobregat: in 2012 the two-hectare area in Barcelona was inaugurated, while the six-hectare Hospitalet area is still pending development. It is a park with a modern design, featuring large solar panels which, while producing energy, also serve as aesthetic elements of the complex, as they have an almost sculptural appearance. The park has two distinct areas: an area of Mediterranean forest with pines and holm oaks, along with the nearby Sierra de Collserola; and a meadow with various geometrically shaped plantations populated with deciduous trees, where the children's playgrounds are also located. A central pathway has several rest areas and geometric flowerbeds planted with shrubs and herbaceous species, and pergolas with photovoltaic panels provide shade for the walkway. The complex includes a bar, a dog area and a circuit of fitness equipment for the elderly.	
1984	Parc de Can Sabaté	1,76 ha	Minería Street, 18 (Sants-Montjuic)	It is located in the Zona Franca, and was created in 1984 with a project by Neus Solé, Imma Jansana and Daniel Navas. The name comes from the Sabaté family, owners of a metallurgical industry on the site. It is a park of elongated rectangular shape, with a single access from Mining Street, and surrounded by buildings on three sides. Upon entering, one first encounters an irregularly shaped pond, located next to a civic center. Next comes a long paved platform located at a higher level than the rest of the park, where there is a green marble pyramid 2.40 meters high, from which a stream of water flows through a channel about 50 meters long to a pool surrounded by a colonnade of eight truncated columns. Behind this colonnade is a small wood, and on the sides of this central platform there are lawns, children's areas, benches and fountains.	
1779	Jardins de Can Sentmenat	1 ha	Can Caralleu Street, 16-18 (Sarriá-Sant Gervasio)	On this land there was a 14th-century masía, Mas Teixidó. In the 17th century it was acquired by the Marquises of Sentmenat, who in 1779 built the palace, in neo-Gothic style, around which the gardens are structured: in front of the front façade there are gardens in classic Frenchified style, with a circular pond surrounded by broderie flowerbeds, and a walkway lined with statues that refer to the heraldic coats of arms of several families related to the Sentmenat family. At the back there were romantic style gardens with an artificial waterfall, nowadays diluted in the forest area that opens to the Sierra de Collserola. In 1960 the Sentmenat family rented the palace to the French consul, until 1974, when they sold it to a real estate company. However, the Barcelona City Council became interested in the preservation of this architectural and artistic heritage, and after reaching an agreement with the developer acquired the estate in 1992. In 1994 the council rented the palace to the Eina design school, and the following year the gardens were opened to the public after a restoration by Patrizia Falcone.	
1992	Parc de Carles I	5,5 ha	Icaria avenue, 90 (Sant Martí)	This park is the result of the urban renewal carried out along the coastline for the 1992 Olympic Games, on land previously used for industrial purposes. The Olympic Port, New Icaria, Cascades and Poblenou parks were also created. The project was designed by Pep Zazurca and Juli Laviña. It is dedicated to Emperor Charles I of Spain and V of Germany, of whom there are fond memories in Barcelona, since in a visit in 1519 he commented that he preferred "to be Count of Barcelona rather than Emperor of the Germanies". The park is shaped like an orange wedge, and along its outer circle runs a water channel that is interrupted by the streets that cross it, in one of its points in the form of a waterfall due to the unevenness, and has several bridges to cross it. There are also grass dunes that isolate the environment from the surrounding noise, lined with rows of plane trees and crowned by cypress trees. Among these vegetal elements is the sculpture El culo (A Santiago Roldán) (1999), by Eduardo Úrculo, a bronze work 6.5 meters high.	
1989	Parc del Carmel	15,32 ha	Carretera del Carmelo (Horta-Guinardó)	It is located around the Carmel mountain, which is part of the Parc dels Tres Turons, right next to Parc Güell. It was formerly a rural area, with a few masías scattered throughout its territory, of which the Can Móra masía —nowadays a geriatrics— stands out. On its grounds is the Santuari de la Mare de Déu del Mont Carmel (1860–1864), which gave its name to the mountain and the neighborhood. Nearby is also the Ermita de la Mare de Déu de Fàtima, built in 1952. There are also two schools (Virolai and CEIP Coves d'en Cimany) and two soccer fields, the Carmelo Municipal Sports Complex. The part of the park corresponding to the entrance on Carretera del Carmelo is called Jardins de Juan Ponce, where there is a home for the elderly, a children's playground and a petanque court. In the central part of the park there is also a work of public art, El orden de hoy es el desorden de mañana (Saint-Just) (1999), by Ian Hamilton Finlay.	
1992	Parc de les Cascades	1,38 ha	Litoral Avenue, 12-14 (Ciutat Vella)	This park is the result of the urban renewal carried out along the coastline for the 1992 Olympic Games, on land previously used for industrial purposes. The Olympic Port, New Icaria, Charles I and Poblenou parks were also created. The project was the work of Martorell-Bohigas-Mackay-Puigdomènech. It is located on the Ronda Litoral, which is underground in that section, and is the entrance hall to the Olympic Village. It is divided into two sections separated by Ramon Trias Fargas street, in each of which there is as a distinctive element a large sculpture and avant-garde style: David i Goliat, by Antoni Llena, and El Poder de la Palabra, by Auke de Vries. The latter is located over a pond that overflows at the lower level in the form of a waterfall, hence the name of the park.	
1978	Parc del Castell de l'Oreneta	17 ha	Montevideo Street, 45 (Sarrià-Sant Gervasio)	The park is located in the foothills of the Sierra de Collserola, so it is mostly a forest park, with an abundance of pines, oaks and carob trees, as well as areas of undergrowth, mainly retama and strawberry tree. In the past there was a castle in this enclave, the Castell de l'Oreneta, which gives its name to the park, originally from 1910 and destroyed during the Civil War, of which some remains remain. On the land there was also a masía, Can Bonavista. Both masías were acquired by the Red Cross, which planned to build a hospital, but the project was not carried out and the land was bought by the City Council. The park was inaugurated in 1978, and in 1993 it was restored by Patrizia Falcone. Ascending along the paths there are several terraces and viewpoints, until reaching the upper area, where there are children's playgrounds, a pony track and a miniature train circuit —inaugurated in 1981— that runs around the Oreneta Station, with a 636-meter route that crosses three tunnels, two bridges and a metal viaduct.	
1997-2007	Parc Central de Nou Barris	17,7 ha	Major de Nou Barris, 1 Square (Between Passeig Verdum and Plaça de Karl Marx) (Nou Barris)	This is the urbanization of an area that was previously quite degraded, with steep slopes that made it difficult for residents to walk. The project was designed by architects Carme Fiol and Andreu Arriola, and was carried out in three phases: 1997–1999, 2000-2003 and 2007. The authors were inspired by Picasso's painting Horta de Sant Joan, in the cubist style, so they fragmented the space into interconnected sections. The park as a whole features ornamental elements in the form of a tuning fork that act as light panels, as well as the presence of water through three lakes with fountains. The lower part of the park was formerly the site of the Manicomio de la Santa Creu, which was reused for municipal facilities, such as the headquarters of the Nou Barris district, a public library and a police station for the Guàrdia Urbana. A technology park, the Fòrum Nord de la Tecnologia, was also built nearby. In the upper lake, a section of the old Dosrius aqueduct was preserved in the form of a bridge. The park was awarded the 2007 International Urban Landscape Award in Frankfurt (Germany).	
2008	Parc del Centre del Poblenou	5,56 ha	Avinguda Diagonal, 116-130 (Sant Martí)	It was created in 2008 with a project of the French architect Jean Nouvel, author also of the skyscraper Torre Agbar, very close to this park. It is divided into several thematic spaces, avant-garde design: first is a pneumatic waste collection plant, whose roof forms an artificial mountain covered with sand and rocks, the Rampa de Rocas, which simulates a lunar landscape. Next come the Bóvedas, four vaults of banana trees of different heights. From here opens a plain containing various elements, such as the Cabañas bajo la lluvia, formed by metal structures covered with climbing plants; the Plaça de la Sardana, a circular square surrounded by weeping willows, designed to practice the popular Catalan dance of the sardana; the Ramos, a series of vertical elements in the form of sculptural planters; the Isla bajo la cúpula, a space surrounded by a water channel that houses a metal dome surrounded by laurels; and the Chimenea, a vestige of an old factory that recalls the industrial past of the area. In another area is the Pozo del Mundo, a crater formed by several spirals of earth, and a field of false pepper trees with a series of metal structures that represent a perfect integration of the sculpture in the natural environment, entitled Los Nidos and Pozos del Cielo (The Nests and Wells of Heaven).	
1965	Parc de Cervantes	9,15 ha	Avinguda Diagonal, 708-716 (Les Corts)	It is a theme park dedicated to roses, with a collection of some 11,000 rose bushes of some 245 different varieties. Designed by Lluís Riudor, it was inaugurated in 1965. Due to the Mediterranean climate of Barcelona, these rose bushes are in bloom practically from April to November, although between May and June they reach their flowering zenith, which gives this park a singular beauty. Every year a competition of new roses is held in this park, which are baptized with different names by their creators. In addition to the rose bushes, the park has several grassy areas and small groves, as well as a children's play area, ping-pong tables and a picnic area. There are also several pergolas that provide shade, as well as several sculptures: Serenidad, by Eulàlia Fàbregas de Sentmenat (1964); Adán, by Jacinto Bustos Vasallo (1968); and Rombos gemelos, by Andreu Alfaro (1977).	
1872	Parc de la Ciutadella	17,42 ha (31 with the zoo)	Passeig Picasso, 1 (Ciutat Vella)	It was established in 1872 on the former grounds of the city fortress, in the image and likeness of the Jardin du Luxembourg in Paris. The project was designed by José Fontseré, who together with the green area designed a central square and a ring road, as well as a monumental fountain and various ornamental elements, two lakes and a wooded area, in addition to various auxiliary buildings and infrastructures. Fontserè had the collaboration of the young Antoni Gaudí, who was involved in the Monumental Waterfall project, where he carried out the hydraulic project and designed an artificial grotto under the waterfall. The monument stands out for its profusion of sculptures, in which several of the best sculptors of the time took part, such as Rossend Nobas, Venancio Vallmitjana, Francisco Pagés Serratosa, Josep Gamot, Manuel Fuxá, Rafael Atché and Joan Flotats. The park was the epicenter of the Universal Exhibition of 1888, which left several buildings that are still preserved: the restaurant, known as Castell dels Tres Dragons and current Zoology Museum, designed by Lluís Domènech i Montaner; the Hibernaculum, designed by Josep Amargós, made of iron and glass following the example of the Crystal Palace of the London Exhibition of 1851; the Martorell Museum of Geology, by Antoni Rovira i Trias; and the Umbráculo, by Josep Fontserè. Within its enclosure is located the Barcelona Zoo, as well as several buildings that survive from the old fortress: the chapel, the governor's palace and the arsenal, current seat of the Parliament of Catalonia. In the old parade ground there is an oval pond with the famous sculpture Desconsol, the work of Josep Llimona. One of the centers of the park is the lake, with several islets and a great profusion of exotic plants and aquatic animals; people can navigate in it with rowboats. Next to the waterfall is the Romantic Garden, with a great variety of plant species.	
1994	Jardins de Clara Campoamor	0,54 ha	Avinguda Diagonal, 609-615 (Les Corts)	Located at 609-615 Avinguda Diagonal, in the district of Les Corts, it was inaugurated on December 3, 1994. It is dedicated to the memory of Clara Campoamor, promoter of the recognition of women's suffrage in Spain during the Second Republic. The space is bounded by the streets of Gandesa, Europa, Joan Güell and Avinguda Diagonal, and is very close to the Maria Cristina metro station and the Trambaix. It is located in an area with a lot of dynamism and affluence due to its commercial, business, health, tourist and university character. Very close to the intersection of two of the busiest roads, Avinguda Diagonal and Ronda del Mig, and close to one of the main entrances to the city, by car, through Avinguda Diagonal. The space houses the sculpture Citerea, a children's play area, ornamental water fountains, a central grass parterre, sandy areas and hard paving on the sides, with specimens of almeces and Canary Island palm trees. At the entrance of the gardens, inside the ornamental water fountains, is located the iconic sculpture Citerea, work of the artist María Luisa Sierra Catalán, inaugurated on July 26, 1993, made of painted steel, inspired by the painting Embarkation for Cythera by the French painter Jean-Antoine Watteau. The work won the public competition promoted by the Barcelona City Council to beautify public spaces in 1990, as part of the urban planning campaign Barcelona posa't guapa.	
1986	Parc del Clot	4,03 ha	Escultors Claperós street, 36 (Sant Martí)	It is an example of a park of architectural design and avant-garde conception, which combines urban aesthetics with a green space available to the general public. The park was designed in 1986 by Daniel Freixes and Vicente Miranda. It is located on the site of an old RENFE workshop, some of whose walls were used as ornamental elements, as can be seen in the arcade converted into a 25 m long aqueduct, which through a waterfall supplies water to the lake located on one side of the park. Nearby is a sort of loggia also made up of walls of the old building, with a series of masonry arches with metal columns; inside is the sculpture Rites of Spring, by the American sculptor Bryan Hunt (1986), a 4 m high bronze piece representing a waterfall.	
	Parc de Collserola	1795 ha	Sierra de Collserola	The Sierra de Collserola is the largest forest area of Barcelona, the main lung of the city and a center of leisure and sports. It belongs to the Serralada Litoral Catalana, and has its highest point in the mountain of Tibidabo (512 m). It extends along the entire western fringe of the city, making it one of the natural borders of the city, next to the sea and the Besòs and Llobregat rivers. Since 1976 it has been declared a metropolitan park of special protection, and some of its areas are natural reserves of flora and fauna. It is an essentially wooded area, with a predominance of pines, holm oaks and oaks, as well as areas of maquis and kermes oaks. Among the animal species that populate the area are wild boars, as well as some 130 species of birds, mammals, fish and reptiles. Its surface is rich in natural springs (about 200), which for centuries have supplied water to the city. In its space are located some buildings, such as the Tibidabo Amusement Park, the Expiatory Temple of the Sacred Heart, the Collserola Tower, the Fabra Observatory, the Hotel Florida, the pavilion of Ràdio Barcelona, the Torre de les Aigües de Dos Rius and some hermitages and masías. There are nature trails in the park, and guided tours and nature observation workshops are organized.	
1987	Parc de la Creueta del Coll	1,68 ha	Pº Mare de Déu del Coll, 77 (Gràcia)	It is located on a hill that is part of the foothills of Tibidabo (Sierra de Collserola). It was transformed into a public park thanks to a project by Martorell-Bohigas-Mackay, and was inaugurated in 1987. The main part of the park contains a large square of 6,000 m^{2}, with a pond that serves as a public swimming pool in summer. The vegetation consists of palm trees (date palms and washingtonias), cypresses, plane trees, oaks, Judas trees, various species of flowers and a lawn. The park is also notable for the placement of two magnificent sculptures: a monolith entitled Totem (1987), by Ellsworth Kelly, at the entrance to the park; and Elogi de l'aigua (1987), by Eduardo Chillida, a 54-ton concrete block suspended over the back of the lake with four steel cables hanging from the mountain, which is reflected in the water as in the myth of Narcissus, according to the author's intention.	

=== D ===
Year	Name	Area	Location	Description	Photo
2007	Jardí dels Drets Humans	1,25 ha	Foneria Street, 19 (Sants-Montjuic)	It is located in the Zona Franca, inside a rectangular block, where formerly there was a lamp factory of the Philips brand. This space was intended as a recreation area for the factory workers, and as such was designed in 1960 by the Dutch landscape designer Van der Harst, wife of the factory director. In 2007 it was opened to the public after a rehabilitation carried out by the municipal architect Jaume Graells. The name comes from the Universal Declaration of Human Rights, approved by the United Nations Organization on December 10, 1948. The most distinctive elements of the park are a small lake with a small island with palm trees in the center and a skating rink. Also, along the entire perimeter of the park there is a set of 31 steel plafonds that contain each of the 30 articles of the Universal Declaration of Human Rights, as well as another one that includes the poem Como la Cigarra, by the Argentine María Elena Walsh, dedicated to the disappeared of the military dictatorships of Chile and Argentina.	
2002	Parc Diagonal Mar	14,3 ha	Llull street, 362 (Sant Martí)	It is so named because it is located at the confluence of Avinguda Diagonal with the Mediterranean Sea. It is the work of architects Enric Miralles and Benedetta Tagliabue, and was built between 1999 and 2002. The land occupied by the park formerly belonged to the metallurgical and railway construction company MACOSA. It is a park of modern design, in which various metallic structures similar to tubular filigree of whimsical shapes stand out, which, like sculptural pieces, mark out the entire area, and which at certain points support large planters made of colored ceramics, the work of the ceramist Antoni Cumella Vendrell. The park is divided into three areas, two smaller ones next to the coastal area, both with a small pond, and another larger one with a larger lake, populated by ducks, geese and waterfowl. A wooden bridge connects the two shores of the lake. There are several grassy hills, one of which, called Magic Mountain, has slides for children to go down. The banks are shaped like sea waves, and are called lungomare, an Italian word meaning "to walk by the sea". The vegetation is composed of 51 different species of trees, including a 150-year-old Canary Island dragon tree.	
2019	Jardins del Doctor Pla i Armengol	3,6 ha	Virgen de Montserrat Avenue 114-132 (Horta-Guinardó)	They are located on a former privately owned estate that housed the Ravetllat-Pla Institute, a tuberculosis research center founded in 1919 by Dr. Ramon Pla i Armengol and veterinarian Joaquim Ravetllat i Estech. The house and gardens of the estate, in noucentist style, were designed in 1930 by the architect Adolfo Florensa and included a group of sculptures scattered throughout the gardens, pools and pergolas. The gardens were opened to the public in 2019, with the house converted into the Núria Pla Museum, consisting of 800 pieces of furniture, painting, sculpture and goldsmithing. After the rehabilitation of the complex, a children's area, an amphitheater, a gazebo, a Parks and Gardens Work Center, urban vegetable gardens, ponds with natural substrates and various pieces of street furniture were also included. Among the sculptures, the Venus de Fréjus Fountain, also designed by Florensa, stands out, as well as the Monument to Ramon Pla i Armengol.	

=== E ===
Year	Name	Area	Location	Description	Photo
1990	Jardí d'Escultures	0,33 ha	Neptuno Square (Sants-Montjuic)	It is located on the mountain of Montjuic, annexed to the Miró Foundation. It was built in 1990 with an architectural project by Jaume Freixa and Jordi Farrando, and in 2002 it was rebuilt by Marina Salvador. It arose as an initiative to place a sculpture garden in the space annexed to the Miró Foundation, formerly known as Plaza del Sol, where the sculpture Manelic by Josep Montserrat, in homage to the writer Àngel Guimerà, had been located since 1909. The project was launched by Rosa Maria Marlet, director of the Miró Foundation, who chose the participants from a group of young artists who had already exhibited at the Foundation's Espai 10. The sculptures initially placed were eight: Aguja, by Tom Carr; Transparente, el paisaje, by Pep Duran; Ctonos, by Gabriel Sáenz Romero; Tejado, by Perejaume; Gran avión de hélice azul, by Josep Maria Riera i Aragó; Dell'Arte, by Jaume Plensa; Gran huso, by Enric Pladevall; and Vuelo 169, by Emma Verlinden, which was removed in 2002 due to its irreversible deterioration. In the 2002 restoration, three more sculptures were added: Génesis, by Ernest Altès; La clase de música, by Cado Manrique; and DT, by Sergi Aguilar.	
1985	Parc de l'Espanya Industrial	4,60 ha	Muntadas Street, 37 (Sants-Montjuic)	It was built in 1985 by architects Luis Peña Ganchegui, Antón Pagola and Monserrat Ruiz, on land vacated by La España Industrial (also known as Vapor Nou de Sants), a former textile factory founded in 1847 and moved to Mollet del Vallès in 1972. The year of its construction it received the FAD Architecture and Interior Design Award. The park is inspired by the four primordial elements: water, earth, fire and air. Along the Passeig de San Antonio, the park is bordered by tall lighting towers, from which steps lead to an artificial lake, which can be crossed by boat. The office building of the old factory, the Casa del Mig, has been preserved and is now a youth center. The park also has a sports center, ping-pong tables and a children's playground, as well as several sculptures: El Dragón, by Andrés Nagel (1987); Neptuno, by Manuel Fuxá (1881); Venus moderna, by José Pérez Pérez "Peresejo" (1929); Torso de mujer, by Enric Casanovas (1947); Los bueyes de la abundancia, by Antoni Alsina (1926); Landa V, by Pablo Palazuelo (1985); and Alto Rhapsody, by Anthony Caro (1985).	
1988	Parc de l'Estació del Nord	3,58 ha	Almogávares Street, 27-61 (Eixample)	It is located on the grounds adjacent to the bus station of the same name, and was created in 1988 with a project by Andreu Arriola, Carme Fiol and Enric Pericas. In 1999 it was expanded by Patrizia Falcone. The park is structured on two levels: accessing from Lepanto Street there is a lower level where there is an area for dogs and a children's play area, as well as the Monument to Juan Pablo Duarte, a work by Félix Tejada; after passing under a bridge that crosses Marina Street and climbing a slight slope, one reaches a higher area, which is the main part of the park, located in front of the station building. Two sculptures integrated with nature stand out here, in the land-art style: Cielo caído and Espiral arbolada, by Beverly Pepper. The first looks like a giant wave emerging from the park's vegetation, made in blue ceramic with the Gaudí technique of trencadís; the second is in the shape of a stone tree trunk, surrounded by linden trees. The same artist designed the park's lighting elements, iron monoliths four meters high; and also the benches, made of artificial stone, which look like chess pieces. The rest of the park alternates grassy areas with wooded spaces, in which acacias and cypresses stand out.	

=== F ===
Year	Name	Area	Location	Description	Photo
1926	Parc de la Font del Racó	1,29 ha	Lluís Muntadas Street, 1 (Sarrià-Sant Gervasio)	It is a forest park, located at the foot of Tibidabo. It was created in 1926 by Nicolás María Rubió y Tudurí. At the top of the park is the funicular up to the Tibidabo Amusement Park. The terrain is on a steep slope, which forms a shady hollow at the bottom. The area is traversed by winding paths that bridge the slope, sometimes with the help of wooden stairs and railings, in a rustic style that fits in with the surrounding nature. The forest is in certain areas quite closed, with leafy trees among which stand out the oaks, the pines and the almeces. In the lower part there is a fountain, which gives the park its name, and nearby there is a plaque in memory of the artist Apel-les Mestres, the work of Francesc Socías i March, placed in 1938.	
1995	Parc de la Font Florida	2,29 ha	Minería Street, 50 (Sants-Montjuic)	It is located next to the mountain of Montjuic, near the Zona Franca. It was created in 1995 with a project by Carles Casamor, Ramon Marquès and Carles Fuentes. The park has two distinct areas: a large tree-lined square, with benches, fountains, children's areas, petanque courts and a pool that brings freshness to the environment, surrounded by ombu trees; and a green area along the slope of a high hill, where a poplar plantation stands out, while at its base the lavender forms a blanket of blue in summer, which contrasts with the yellow of the tipuanas. The first zone is more urban, with trees lined up and spaces for people to enjoy, while the second is wilder, imitating the gardening style initiated on Montjuic mountain by Jean-Claude Nicolas Forestier for the 1929 Barcelona International Exposition.	
2004	Parc del Fòrum	14 ha	Plaça del Fórum, 1 (Sant Martí)	It is located on the border between Barcelona and Sant Adrià de Besòs, on the site where the Universal Forum of Cultures 2004 was held. The main space is a large esplanade, the Forum Square, designed by Elías Torres and José Antonio Martínez Lapeña, presided over by a large photovoltaic panel, one of the most emblematic elements of the site. The complex includes the 5.2-hectare Auditorium Park, designed by Alejandro Zaera, named after two auditoriums with open-air bleachers designed for concerts and shows; the space between the two is formed by a series of dunes that combine green spaces with pink-toned, crescent-shaped concrete tile pavements. Next to the park is the 2-hectare bathing area, designed by Beth Galí and Jaume Benavent, a sand-free beach with access by steps and ramps to the seashore, enclosed by posts to form a safe environment, like a swimming pool. This area is protected from the waves by a reef, which in turn forms an artificial island called Pangea.	
1916	Jardí de la Fundació Julio Muñoz Ramonet	3594 m^{2}	Muntaner Street, 282 (Sarrià-Sant Gervasi)	Located on the Can Fabra estate, it was owned by Fernando Fabra y Puig, who in 1916 commissioned the French landscape designer Jean-Claude Nicolas Forestier to design the garden. In 1917 the main house was built by Enric Sagnier. In 1945 the estate was acquired by the businessman Julio Muñoz Ramonet, who commissioned a remodeling of the garden to the landscape designer Joan Mirambell i Ferran, who worked on the project between 1956 and 1957. The garden has two levels: the "lower garden", presided over by a pond with the sculpture Seated Woman, a work by Josep Dunyach from 1919; and the "upper garden", where there is another pond, populated by water lilies and flanked by two parallel pergolas with six sculptures by Josep Dunyach and Vicente Navarro. In front of the house there are two other sculptures by Josep Cañas.	

=== G ===
Year	Name	Area	Location	Description	Photo
2004	Parc lineal de Garcia Fària	5,2 ha	Passeig de Farcia Fària (Sant Martí)	This park was created in 2004 in the context of the remodeling of the Diagonal Mar area for the celebration of the Universal Forum of Cultures, with a project by Pere Joan Ravetllat and Carme Ribas. The name comes from Pere Garcia Fària (Barcelona, 1858–1927), civil engineer and architect, who was director of the Sanitation Service of the Barcelona City Council. It is a promenade more than one kilometer long —hence the name linear park— which is located on the parking lot next to the Ronda del Litoral, between the streets Bilbao and Josep Pla, and links the Poblenou and Diagonal Mar parks. The main part of its route is a hard-paved track, ideal for running on bicycles or roller skates, lined with green areas and children's playgrounds. The vegetation is confined to trapezoidal-shaped flowerbeds, some with a double slope, with grass on one side and white oleander on the other, and several beds of grasses, such as Cenchrus setaceus, Hyparrhenia sp., Festuca sp., Pennisetum villosum and Nassella tenuissima.	
1992	Parc de les Glòries	2,12 ha	Plaça de les Glòries Catalanes (Sant Martí)	It is located in the Plaça de les Glòries Catalanes, at the confluence of Avinguda Diagonal, Gran Via de les Corts Catalanes and Avinguda Meridiana. There was a former park here between 1990 and 1992, designed by architects Andreu Arriola, Bet Figueras and Artur Juanmartí. After some remodeling works of the square to reduce traffic to underground levels, a new park of 20 400 m^{2} was inaugurated in 2019, dominated by the Gran Clariana, a large grassy esplanade of 1.1 hectares located where the old road junction. Adjacent to this central space are various plant areas, a play area for children's games, an area for dogs and a sports area, as well as a gardeners' hut, a nursery with various species of trees and two kiosk-bars. A second phase of the park is still being planned, which will include more green areas, children's areas, sports areas and areas for dogs, as well as urban vegetable gardens, petanque courts, an exotic garden, a "water mirror" and an area for shows called the "sensory agora". This second phase can be executed when the construction of the road tunnels for the undergrounding of traffic, scheduled for early 2021, is completed.	
2002-2007	Parc lineal de la Gran Via	25 ha	Gran Via de les Corts Catalanes (Sant Martí)	It is located in a section of the Gran Via de les Corts Catalanes between Plaça de les Glòries Catalanes and Sant Adriàn de Besós. It was designed by Andreu Arriola and Carme Fiol. This is a highway with heavy traffic, so the first intervention consisted of installing a series of acoustic screens to dampen noise. The pedestrian area is divided in two by the road, so numerous bridges and footbridges were built to connect the two sides of the Gran Via. The resulting public space was furnished with various elements, such as an elevated water channel with waterfalls falling into various ponds, or a series of benches with different designs: snail, swallow, star, spiral or boomerang.	
1900-1914	Parc Güell	17,18 ha	Olot street, 1-13 (Gràcia)	The work of the modernist architect Antoni Gaudí, it was commissioned by his patron, Count Eusebi Güell, to build a residential development in the style of English garden cities. It is located in the so-called Montaña Pelada, in the neighborhood of La Salut. The project was unsuccessful, as only one of the 60 plots into which the land was divided was sold. Despite this, the accesses to the park and the service areas were built, and the land was developed. It was a steep site, with steep slopes that Gaudí overcame with a system of viaducts integrated into the terrain. The park has a monumental entrance, with two entrance pavilions for the porter's lodge and administration, surrounded by a wall of masonry and polychrome glazed ceramics; past the pavilions is a staircase leading to the upper levels, decorated with sculpted fountains featuring a dragon or salamander; This staircase leads to the Hypostyle Hall, which would have served as the market of the urbanization, made with large Doric columns; above this room is a large square in the form of a Greek theater, with the famous sliding bench covered with ceramic pieces (trencadís), the work of Josep Maria Jujol. The show house in the park, designed by Francisco Berenguer, was Gaudí's residence from 1906 to 1926, and now houses the Gaudí House-Museum. In the 1960s, the Austrian Garden, designed by Lluís Riudor, was added. In 1984 Unesco included Parc Güell as a World Heritage Site.	
1918	Parc del Guinardó	15,90 ha	Garriga i Roca street, 1-13 (Horta-Guinardó)	The park is located on the Guinardó hill, where there was formerly a rustic estate, Mas Guinardó, which housed Miguel de Cervantes when he visited Barcelona; it is also said to have been the home of the bandit Perot Rocaguinarda. In 1910 it became municipal property, and the French landscape architect Jean-Claude Nicolas Forestier, who was assisted by Nicolau Maria Rubió i Tudurí, was commissioned to landscape the area, and the park was inaugurated in 1918. The intervention focused mainly on the eastern part of the hill, while the rest was left as a forest area. Forestier's project was of a Mediterranean and classicist character, where water had a special role, which from a pool located on the highest point of the eastern slope of the hill poured down through a series of canals and terraces with small waterfalls and pools. In this area there is also the Fuente del Cuento (Story Fountain), dating from 1739, and a sculpture called El niño del aro (1961), by Joaquim Ros i Bofarull. The forest area is populated with typical Mediterranean species such as pines, cedars and oaks, as well as undergrowth areas. In 1977 the park was remodeled by Joaquim Casamor, urbanizing the lower terraces with children's areas and a stage for open-air shows.	
1971	Parc de la Guineueta	3,01 ha	Plaça de la República (Nou Barris)	It was created in 1971 by Joaquim Casamor, director of Parks and Gardens of Barcelona. The park of the same name as its neighborhood takes its name from an old masía called Can Guineueta (guineu is Catalan for "fox", and the suffix eta is a diminutive). It extends in a linear fashion between the blocks of buildings of the La Guineueta and Verdum neighborhoods, on land that was once a ravine. In the upper part, facing the Ronda de Dalt, there is a soccer field and several sports facilities, while in the lower part is the most landscaped part of the park, where next to a lake is the main monument of the park, the sculpture Guineu, by Julià Riu i Serra, in honor of the neighborhood. Also in its enclosure is the Monumento a Blas Infante, composed of a frieze with eight truncated columns representing the eight Andalusian provinces, the work of Josep Lluís Delgado, paid for by the Andalusian Center of Barcelona in 1982, to which was added a bust of the Andalusian politician in 1995, the work of Xavier Cuenca Iturat. The lower and upper parts are connected by two parallel paths that fork at the top of the park, between which is a landscaped grove. On the right side there are several squares that serve as recreational and meeting spaces; one of them bears the name of Jardins de San Juan de Puerto Rico, which was the initial name of the park.	

=== J ===
Year	Name	Area	Location	Description	Photo
2012	Jardí del silenci	0,1 ha	Carrer Encarnació 62-64 (Gràcia)	The garden is situated in the Gràcia neighborhood of Barcelona. It was occupied in 2012 during a popular mobilization against the creation of a 6-store private parking. In 2014, after the creation of the association Salvem el Jardí ("Let's save the garden") and a campaign against the construction works, the garden was declared protected and the association was left in charge of it.	Jardí del Silenci: on top entrance, on bottom interior
1967	Jardins de Jaume Vicens i Vives	1,37 ha	Avinguda Diagonal, 639 (Les Corts)	The gardens are located on Avinguda Diagonal, inside a block in which they are surrounded by buildings on three of its four sides. It is the real estate complex called Barcelona-2, built in 1966. The gardens were commissioned to Nicolás María Rubió y Tudurí, who designed a set of grass parterres with some scattered trees. These flowerbeds are at a higher level than the paths that cross the park, and in their interior he arranged several quadrangular-shaped squares with benches to sit on, which are like islands in the surrounding green sea. The developer, Manuel de la Quintana, commissioned the sculptor Frederic Marès to place a set of decorative sculptures scattered throughout the garden area, all of them with figures of animals. A group of 24 free-standing sculptures was installed, 12 in bronze, 9 in stone and 3 in marble, plus two reliefs, one in stone and the other in marble. Among the animals represented, most of them linked to the theme of hunting, there are deer, bears, wild boars, roe deer, gazelles, fallow deer and goats, some of them currently mutilated due to acts of vandalism.	
2003	Jardins de Joan Brossa	5,3 ha	Dante Square/ Miramar Avenue (Sants-Montjuic)	They are located on the mountain of Montjuic, on the land formerly occupied by the Montjuic Amusement Park (1966–1998), which for years combined fairground attractions with various shows and musical concerts and made this area of Montjuic one of the main leisure areas of Barcelona. With the end of the municipal concession of the land in 1998, the area was turned into a public park, with a project designed by Patrizia Falcone, which was inaugurated in 2003. The gardens are dedicated to the Catalan poet Joan Brossa, in line with other gardens in the Montjuic area dedicated to poets. From the former amusement park, several facilities remain, such as the Damm kiosk and the Parasol, former bar-restaurant designed by Lluís Riudor and Antoni M. Riera Clavillé in 1965, as well as several sculptures that adorned the old leisure area: in 1966, with the inauguration of the park, were placed A Carmen Amaya, by Josep Cañas, and A Joaquim Blume, by Nicolau Ortiz; in 1972 were inaugurated El Payaso (Charlie Rivel), by Joaquim Ros i Sabaté, and Charlot, by Núria Tortras.	
1970	Jardins de Joan Maragall	3,63 ha	Estadio Avenue, s/n (Sants-Montjuic)	It is located on the mountain of Montjuic, between the Olympic Stadium and the National Palace. It is located around the Albéniz Palace, residence of the Spanish Royal Family during their visits to Barcelona. The origin of the garden comes from the International Exhibition of Barcelona (1929), when the Royal Pavilion was built by Juan Moya, in baroque style inspired by the French palace architecture of the 18th century. Next to it was the Palace of the Missions, which was demolished for the expansion of the gardens in the 1970s, a project by Joaquim Maria Casamor, who designed a set of French style, with abundant sculptural decoration. The garden was dedicated to the Catalan poet Joan Maragall, in line with other gardens in the Montjuic area dedicated to poets. The gardens are organized in three zones: one in front of the main facade of the palace, with two ponds at each end and a central area of flowerbeds, highlighting at the opposite end of the palace a pavilion with the sculpture Susanna in the bath, by Théophile-Eugène-Victor Barrau; another on the sides of the palace, which corresponds to the old gardens of 1929, where two fountains with tritons and two sculptures entitled Reclining Woman, by Enric Monjo stand out; and the northern area, facing the National Palace (home of the MNAC), where a peristyle courtyard with an Ionic colonnade, with the sculpture Serena, by Pilar Francesch, stands out, and where the hermitage Santa Madrona is located.	
1983	Parc de Joan Miró	4,71 ha	Tarragona Street, 74 (Eixample)	It was formerly known as Parque del Matadero, because it was the site of the old Municipal Slaughterhouse. The project was the work of architects Antoni Solanas, Màrius Quintana, Beth Galí and Andreu Arriola, and was named in recognition of the surrealist painter Joan Miró. The park has two distinct areas: a large square at street level, where there is a pond with the sculpture Dona i Ocell by Joan Miró; and the park itself, located at a lower level, with shaded paths of pergolas with climbing plants, and a grove populated mainly by pines, poplars, palms and oaks, planted symmetrically. Next to Vilamarí Street there is a pond in the center of which is the Joan Miró Library, which has a curious door formed by two steel hinges in the shape of children walking, which bears the name of Escolares and was designed by the architects who designed the park.	
2009	Parc de Joan Reventós	2 ha	Ràfols Street, 10 (Sarrià-Sant Gervasi)	The park is located on the site of an old torrent, the Riera de les Monges, which came down from the Sierra de Collserola. Therefore, its initial name was Torrent de les Monges Park, although it was later changed in honor of the politician Joan Reventós. It was created in 2008 with a project of Bagursa (Barcelona Gestió Urbanística), and inaugurated in 2009. Before its remodeling it was an abandoned forest area, which was recovered as a green area for the neighborhood. Some of the previously existing architectural elements were maintained, such as a bridge that crosses the torrent, as well as most of the native vegetation, mainly pine trees. A rainwater drainage system was installed to channel water from the old torrent. The path along the torrent is a paved roadway that rises above the terrain and runs around the perimeter of the park. In the upper part of the park —the widest—, there is a large esplanade dedicated to children's games.	
1994	Parc de Josep Maria Serra Martí	4,26 ha	Antonio Machado Street (Nou Barris)	This park is dedicated to Josep Maria Serra Martí, deputy mayor of Urban Planning and Municipal Services of Barcelona and one of the promoters of the 1992 Olympic Games. It was created in 1994 by Cinto Hom and Carles Casamor. It is a neighborhood area, where one day a week an open-air market is organized. As it is located on a sloping terrain, it is structured in platforms separated by green slopes, with a multipurpose esplanade in the center. The focal point of the park is the Magic Fountain Manuel de Falla, the work of Pedro Barragan, consisting of a pond that houses a metal platform from which water cascades, and two large rocks next to some water jets, also has light and sound games, hence the name "magic fountain". There is also a sculpture of a flamenco "bailaora" (flamenco dancer) entitled Alegrías, a work by Ignasi Farreras.	

=== L ===
Year	Name	Area	Location	Description	Photo
1794-1808	Parc del Laberint d'Horta	9,10 ha	Passeig de los CastYears 1-17 (Horta-Guinardó)	It is the oldest preserved garden in Barcelona. It is a neoclassical garden created on the initiative of Joan Antoni Desvalls, sixth Marquis of Llupià, and built by the Italian architect Domenico Bagutti and the French gardener Joseph Delvalet between 1794 and 1808. The garden extends over three stepped terraces: on the lower one is the vegetal labyrinth that gives name to the park, formed by 750 meters of trimmed cypresses, with an area of 45 x 50 meters; on the intermediate terrace, which rises above the labyrinth, is the Mirador or Belvedere, where two Italian-style temples with statues of Danae and Artemis and Tuscan columns, and two fountains decorated with reliefs and four busts stand out; on the third terrace rises the Pavilion of Charles IV, in neoclassical style and Italianate air —slightly reminiscent of the Villa Capra of Palladio—, crowned by a sculpture depicting Apollo and the muses. Behind the pavilion is a large pond fed by the fountain of the nymph Egeria, inspired by Stowe's grotto. In the 19th century, a romantic garden was added. It was restored by Joaquim Casamor in 1971, and by Patrizia Falcone in 1994.	
1917-1924	Jardins de Laribal	3,16 ha	Pº Santa Madrona, 2 (Sants-Montjuic)	It is located on the mountain of Montjuic, and was built between 1917 and 1924, on the occasion of the International Exhibition of Barcelona in 1929. These gardens were the work of Jean-Claude Nicolas Forestier and Nicolás María Rubió y Tudurí, who created an ensemble with a markedly Mediterranean character and classicist taste, with a style inspired by the Hispano-Arabic style that Forestier had developed in the Maria Luisa Park in Seville. The gardens are structured through a series of terraces with pergolas, small squares and fountains, leading to the Greek Theater, an open-air theater inspired by the ancient Greek theaters, designed by Ramon Reventós. The gardens are home to several unique spaces, such as the stairs of the Generalife, which connect the Laribal Gardens with those of the Greek Theater, designed by Forestier with inspiration from the Generalife; the Font del Gat, a famous fountain next to which the former owner, Josep Laribal, built a neo-Arabic style villa, which is now a restaurant; and the Colla de l'Arròs rose garden, an oval courtyard surrounded by cypress trees, under a pergola with terracotta pillars and a gazebo with a fountain in the center and different varieties of rose bushes. There are also several sculptures: Estival, by Jaume Otero (1929); Joven de la trenza, by Josep Viladomat (1928); and Reposo (1925), by Josep Viladomat on an original by Manolo Hugué. The Museu Etnològic i de Cultures del Món is located within the gardens, and the Joan Miró Foundation is located nearby.	
1988	Parc de les Corts	0,71 ha	Numancia Street, 101-105 (Les Corts)	It is located in the square of the same name, which bears the name of the district and the former municipality of Les Corts de Sarrià, integrated in 1897 in the city of Barcelona. It was created in 1988 with a project by Carme Fiol. The park is located in a rectangular square, crossed diagonally by a meandering water channel as an artificial river, which can be forded by several pylon bridges over the water. On this land there was formerly a brick factory called Can Macians, honored in the park with two brick arches located at both ends of the river. In addition to the water channel, there are several small squares with children's play areas, ping-pong tables, and a pipican. The vegetation consists of several flowerbeds in the form of slopes that serve to separate the different areas, populated by various species of trees, most of which are evergreen. As an artistic element, the park includes a sculpture located in the water at one end of the canal, entitled Euclidea (1989), by Luis Gueilburt.	

=== M ===
Year	Name	Area	Location	Description	Photo
1998	Jardins de Maternitat	7,68 ha	Travessera de Les Corts, 131-159 (Les Corts)	These are the gardens of the Casa Provincial de Maternitat i Expòsits de Barcelona, a former hospital complex now converted into various social, institutional and welfare facilities. It was built in several phases between 1883 and 1957, and several architects were involved in its construction, such as Camil Oliveras, General Guitart, Josep Bori, Manuel Baldrich, Juan Rubió and Josep Goday. The interior of the hospital complex is home to extensive gardens that have been open to the public since 1998, structured along a longitudinal axis that runs from Travessera de Les Corts to Diagonal. The gardens have a peaceful appearance despite the hustle and bustle of the people who constantly pass through them, with wide lawns lined with trees of various species, such as pines, elms, plum trees, cinnamon trees, catalpas and love trees. There are several sculptures scattered around the grounds: Nuestra Señora embarazada (1944), by Vicente Navarro; Sagrado Corazón (1944), from the workshop El Arte Cristiano; Maternidad. Ayuda al desvalido (1956), by Luisa Granero; Sor Antonia (1963), by Antonio Sacramento; and Límite interior. Libro abierto (1987), by Sergi Aguilar.	
2000	Parc de la Maquinista de Sant Andreu	2,1 ha	Ferran Junoy street, 1 (Sant Andreu)	The park is located on the grounds of La Maquinista Terrestre y Marítima, a railway machinery construction company founded in 1855, which moved to Santa Perpètua de Mogoda in 1993. The land then became public property, part of it being used for the park and part for the construction of a large shopping center, also known as La Maquinista. The park was designed by the L-35 team of architects (Juan Fernando de Mendoza and José Ignacio Galán) and inaugurated in 2000. In the center is a lake in the shape of an orange wedge, called Narcís Monturiol Pond, which is the most prominent feature of the park, at the end of it is an iron building in the shape of a boat, designed by Juan Fernando de Mendoza, which houses the Macosa MTM Museum. Also, a large wheel from the factory's machinery stands out from the water of the lake, positioned as if it were a sculpture. It is the transmission wheel of the first steam engine that the factory had used at its first site in La Barceloneta, and which was brought to Sant Andreu in 1963 as a decorative element.	
1962-1969	Jardins del Mirador de l'Alcalde	1,37 ha	Plaça del Mirador (Sants-Montjuic)	They are located on the mountain of Montjuic, and were developed between 1962 and 1969 with a garden project by Joaquim Casamor, while Carles Buïgas was in charge of the monumental fountain. The starting point for these gardens was the concession in 1960 of Montjuic Castle to the Barcelona City Council. Work then began on adapting the castle for its new use, which also involved the urbanization and landscaping of the surroundings of the fortress. The name comes from the then mayor of Barcelona, José María de Porcioles. The area is structured in a series of terraces at different levels, connected by stairs and gently sloping flowerbeds. At the top is a pond with an ornamental fountain from which water cascades into a lower pond, where there is another ornamental fountain. The paths and small squares of the Mirador are formed by a 420 m^{2} mosaic pavement, designed by Joan Josep Tharrats. On the upper level is also the sculpture Homenaje a Barcelona (1968), by Josep Maria Subirachs.	
1992	Parc del Mirador del Migdia	8,73 ha	Passeig de Migdia (Sants-Montjuic)	It is a large forest area located on the southern slope of the mountain of Montjuic. It was created in 1992 with a project by Beth Galí, Jaume Benavent and Andreu Arriola. It is located between Montjuic Castle and the Lluís Companys Olympic Stadium, next to the Southwest Cemetery and the Fossar de la Pedrera, and includes the area of Sot del Migdia, an old quarry converted into a space for concerts and sporting events. The steep slope of the park means that its paths are laid out in zig-zag, while the green areas recreate the typical Mediterranean forest, although at some points it has a more artificial appearance, such as the palm tree promenade at the top. In the area known as Camí de l'Esparver are the remains of the Castillo del Puerto, an ancient enclave of medieval origin of which only a few stones remain that were the base of a tower. A plaque commemorating the Millennium of Catalonia was placed here in 1989. The park has magnificent views of the Port of Barcelona and El Prat de Llobregat, as well as the Mediterranean Sea.	
1995-1997	Parc del Mirador del Poble-sec	2,83 ha	Passeig de Montjuic, 28 (Sants-Montjuic)	It is located on the northwest slope of the mountain of Montjuic, overlooking the neighborhood of El Poble-sec, hence the name. It was built between 1995 and 1997 with a project by Patrizia Falcone. It is flanked by the Spring Park and the Mossèn Costa i Llobera Gardens, while after the ascent of the mountain comes to the Miramar Gardens, designed by Jean-Claude Nicolas Forestier, who had planned on this side of the mountain a monumental access of which only the stairs were made, which go from the port to the Plaça de la Armada, at the top of the viewpoint. The park is classified as a forest park, since most of it is an area of forest typical of the mountain. The most elaborate elements of the park are in the lower part, where there are petanque courts, ping-pong tables, children's play areas and a long pergola for shade. Also in this area there is a pond planted with aquatic plants, where water falls through a stepped waterfall that spills from another pond located at a higher level.	
1919-1923	Jardins de Miramar	0,59 ha	Carretera de Miramar (Sants-Montjuic)	It is located on the mountain of Montjuic, and was built between 1919 and 1923, on the occasion of the International Exhibition of Barcelona in 1929, being the work of Jean-Claude Nicolas Forestier and Nicolás María Rubió y Tudurí, in parallel to the Laribal Gardens and those of the Greek Theater. The gardens are located on an esplanade in the Mirador de Miramar, a balcony 60 m above sea level from where magnificent panoramic views of the city and the port of Barcelona are observed. Behind this space is the Hotel Miramar, a building built as a restaurant for the International Exhibition of 1929, and that between 1959 and 1983 was the headquarters of TVE in Catalonia; in 2006 it was converted into a hotel. The garden consists of several flower beds bordered by low hedges, as well as trees of various species. In its central part there is a fountain, and three sculptures of female figures decorate this space: Fertilidad(1929) and Serenidad (1929), by Josep Clarà, and La vendimiadora (or Pomona, 1927), by Pablo Gargallo.	
1947	Turó de Monterols	1,94 ha	Muntaner street, 426 (Sarrià-Sant Gervasi)	The park, classified as forest, is located on a hill called Turó de Monterols —also sometimes called Turó d'en Gil—, 127.3 m above sea level, belonging to the foothills of Tibidabo. The land was owned by the Gil family until 1940, when the City Council of Barcelona bought the property. The park was inaugurated in 1947, after a remodeling carried out by Lluís Riudor. The vegetation is of Mediterranean type, with pines and carob trees, as well as oaks, cypresses, holm oaks, olive and almond trees. In a small hollow that was formerly a quarry there are palmettos and aromatic plants (rosemary, thyme, lavender and sage), as well as shrub species such as mastic, arbutus, broom and hazel. The paths are circular and ascending, with stairs in some sections; sometimes they open onto small squares where children's areas or ping-pong tables are located. Near the entrance to Gualbes Street there is a stone fountain with a relief of putti holding garlands of flowers and fruit, an anonymous work perhaps from the workshop of a stonemason.	
	Parc de Montjuic	234 ha	Muntaya de Montjuic	The mountain of Montjuic was for many centuries a forest area, used mainly for its quarries. In the 18th century Montjuic Castle was built, a military fortress to dominate the city. In 1883 the Montjuic Cemetery was installed. It was in the 20th century when the mountain began to be urbanized: after some first attempts in 1894 and 1905, in 1914 the first effective action was made with the opening of an avenue that led from the Gran Via to the Miramar area, by Josep Amargós. Finally, the definitive impulse came with the celebration of the Barcelona International Exposition of 1929: in 1917 the works of urbanization of the northern slope of the mountain began, in charge of the engineer Marià Rubió i Bellver, while the landscaping project was in charge of Jean-Claude Nicolas Forestier and Nicolau Maria Rubió i Tudurí, who elaborated the Laribal and Miramar Gardens. The 1929 exposition bequeathed numerous constructions, such as the National Palace, the Spanish Village, the Greek Theater, the Magic Fountain and the Olympic Stadium. Also in the 1920s, the Vivero de Tres Pins was located on the northwest slope of the mountain, where plants were grown to supply the city's gardens. In 1930 the Botanical Garden was established, and in the 1940s the Acclimatization Garden was installed. In 1960, with the donation to the city of the Montjuic Castle, the Mayor's Viewpoint was installed in its surroundings. In the 1970s several thematic gardens were created, such as the Mossèn Costa i Llobera Gardens and the Mossèn Cinto Verdaguer Gardens, the work of Joaquim Casamor, as well as the Joan Maragall Gardens, located around the Albeniz Palace. A final boost to gardening in the area came with the celebration of the 1992 Olympic Games, when the Mirador del Migdia was opened and a new Botanical Garden was installed, dedicated to Mediterranean plants from all over the world. The Games also left behind facilities such as the Palau Sant Jordi and the Montjuic Telecommunications Tower. Shortly after, the Mirador del Poble Sec was also opened, as well as the Sculpture Garden annexed to the Miró Foundation. Finally, in 2003 the Joan Brossa Gardens were inaugurated, located on the land formerly occupied by the Montjuic Amusement Park.	
1959	Jardins de Moragas	0,39 ha	Tavern street (Sarrià-Sant Gervasi)	It was created in 1959 with a project by Lluís Riudor and Joaquim Casamor. It was named in honor of Fidel de Moragas i Tavern, former owner of the place. It is a neighborhood garden, small in size but carefully designed and rich in plant species. It is currently surrounded by buildings on three sides, with only one public access from Tavern Street. After crossing the entrance a winding path leads to an upper level, where on the left is a children's play area, including a skating rink. The rest is dominated by vegetation, arranged in quadrangular flowerbeds separated by sablon paths. In a corner of the walls surrounding the garden there is a fountain in a niche.	
1970	Jardines de Mossèn Cinto Verdaguer	4,30 ha	De los Naranjos street, 1-5 (Sants-Montjuic)	It is located on the mountain of Montjuic, in the area between the Montjuic funicular and the Joan Brossa Gardens, where there used to be a quarry, located at the foot of Montjuic Castle. The park was designed by Joaquim Maria Casamor, and dedicated to the Catalan poet Jacinto Verdaguer, in line with other gardens in the Montjuic area dedicated to poets. The garden specializes in aquatic, bulbous and rhizomatous plants, which is why it is classified as a theme park. Within the grounds of the park there are several sculptures, such as Maternidad, by Sebastià Badia (1970), and Joven de los lirios. Homenaje a Jacinto Verdaguer, by Ramon Sabí (1970).	
1970	Jardins de Mossèn Costa i Llobera	6,15 ha	Ctra. de Miramar, near Plaça de la Armada (Sants-Montjuic)	This park was created in parallel to the previous one, on the mountain of Montjuic, also the work of Joaquim Maria Casamor, and dedicated to another poet, Miquel Costa i Llobera. It is also a thematic garden, in this case specialized in cacti and succulents. Being located on a mountainside sheltered from the wind, this area has a microclimate about three degrees above the average temperature of Barcelona, so it can accommodate this type of plants that are not typical of the city. The botanist Joan Pañella Bonastre was involved in the planting. The gardens house several sculptures: L'au dels temporals, el pi de Formentor, by Joaquim Ros i Bofarull (1970); La encajera, by Josep Viladomat (1972); and A Joan Pañella, by Mertixell Duran (1991). This garden was considered in 1987 one of the ten best in the world, according to a New York Times journalist.	

=== N ===
Year	Name	Area	Location	Description	Photo
1992	Parc de la Nova Icària	6,34 ha	Arquitecte Sert street (Sant Martí)	This park, designed by the Martorell-Bohigas-Mackay team, stems from the urban renewal carried out along the coastline for the 1992 Olympic Games, on land previously used for industrial purposes. The name comes from the Greek island of Icaria, which Étienne Cabet recalled in his work Voyage en Icarie, giving rise to the Utopian project of the Icarians. Between 1846 and 1847 some of his followers in Barcelona settled in this area of the Poblenou neighborhood, which they called Nova Icària. Along its route runs the Ronda del Litoral, part of which is underground and leads to the Plaza de los Campeones, where one of the podiums used in the Olympic Games is located, and on whose pavement are inscribed the names of various athletes and Olympic champions in history. The most distinctive element of the park is a large lake, shaped like the Greek island of Icaria, over which several wooden bridges cross to access from one side of the Ronda del Litoral to the other.	

=== P ===
Year	Name	Area	Location	Description	Photo
1926	Gardens of the Palau Reial de Pedralbes	7,28 ha	Av. Diagonal, 686 (Les Corts)	The Palace has its origins in the old Can Feliu masía, from the 17th century, bought in 1862 by Count Eusebi Güell. The architect Joan Martorell was commissioned to renovate the house and built a small palace with a Caribbean air. Later, Antoni Gaudí was commissioned to build a fence wall and the gatehouse pavilions, as well as the gardens, for which he built a pergola and two fountains —of which the Fountain of Hercules still survives— and planted various types of Mediterranean plants (pines, eucalyptus, palms, cypresses and magnolias). In 1918 Eusebi Güell gave the house and part of the gardens to the Crown, so a new remodeling was undertaken to convert it into the Royal Palace (1919–1924), by the architects Eusebi Bona and Francesc Nebot, in noucentist style. Then the gardens were remodeled, which were designed by Nicolás María Rubió y Tudurí, based on a project that integrated, in a decorative geometric layout, most of the existing trees, with a pond and various decorative elements, such as Gaudí's fountain, bamboo benches, three luminous fountains by Carles Buïgas and various statues, such as the one of Queen Isabel II showing her son Alfonso XII in front of the main entrance of the palace, a work by Agapito Vallmitjana.	
1894-1898	Palau de les Heures	3,50 ha	Pº Valle de Hebrón, 171 (Horta-Guinardó)	The Palau de les Heures ("ivy palace" in Catalan) —also known as Casa Gallart— was built between 1894 and 1898 by the architect Augusto Font Carreras. It is currently the headquarters of the Bosch i Gimpera Foundation for postgraduate university studies, and is integrated into the Mundet Campus of the University of Barcelona. It is a building inspired by the French château typology, with the façade presided over by a terracotta with an allegory of The Ivy by Josep Campeny. The palace is located on top of a promontory that is accessed through a series of landscaped terraces, with ramps and balustrades elaborated in the style of the Italian Renaissance garden. The gardens, designed by Adrià Piera, are structured on each level around central ponds with water fountains, and in the surrounding space there are broderie flowerbeds surrounded by tree species such as palms, magnolias and horse chestnut trees. There are also rose bushes and terracotta pots with geraniums. The gardens were restored in 1999 by Patrizia Falcone and opened to the public.	
1898-1903	Palau Robert	0,39 ha	Passeig de Gracia, 107 (Eixample)	The Palau Robert is located at the crossroads between Passeig de Gracia and Avinguda Diagonal, two of Barcelona's main thoroughfares. It is a neoclassical palace built between 1898 and 1903 with a project by the French architect Henri Grandpierre —although the construction was directed by Joan Martorell— for the financier and politician Robert Robert i Surís. The garden was designed by Ramón Oliva, author of the Campo del Moro in Madrid and the Campo Grande Park in Valladolid. It has three large flowerbeds, two lateral and one central, separated by sablon paths. It houses several species of scarce presence in the city, such as the Levante plane tree, the Arizona cypress or the golden willow. Many of the palms in the garden came from the Universal Exposition of Barcelona in 1888. The garden also contains the sculpture La Luna, by Kiku Mistu (2001). The building is currently owned by the Generalitat de Catalunya and houses a cultural center and a tourist office. The garden was opened to the public in 1998.	
1986	Parc de la Pegaso	3,65 ha	C/ de la Sagrera, 179-197 (Sant Andreu)	This park is located on the site of the former ENASA factory (Empresa Nacional de Autocamiones, Sociedad Anónima), builder of the famous Pegaso trucks. Some remains of the old factory are still preserved, such as the entrance gate and the office building, used as neighborhood facilities. It was created in 1986 by Enric Batlle and Joan Roig, who designed a project that combines landscaping with recreational and sports spaces. There are three main areas: the children's playground; a more architectural-looking area, with walls and columns with pergolas, which houses several sports courts; and the landscaped area, which is perhaps the most outstanding element of the park, with a winding pond that runs through much of the park like a canal, crossed by several bridges, one of them curved, in the Japanese style. The canal surrounds an extensive green area that reaches a certain height at several points, with viewpoints that offer a wide view of the whole.	
2008	Jardins de Piscines i Esports	1,69 ha	C/ Ganduxer, 17-27 (Sarrià-Sant Gervasi)	Its origins lie in the sports complex of the same name, inaugurated in 1935, part of which became a public garden in 2008, while the rest of the land still contains several sports facilities. The grounds are rectangular in shape, and feature large grassy areas lined with trees, mainly pines and acacias. In one corner is a pond with aquatic plants, bordered by willows. There are paved paths arranged in a circular layout, inviting to stroll, as well as a children's play area.	
1991	Parc del Pla de Fornells	2,5 ha	C/ dels Nou Barris, 21 (Nou Barris)	The park is located on a hillside of the Sierra de Collserola. It was created in 1991 with a design by Pere Llimona Torras and Xavier Ruiz Vallés. At the bottom is a paved square, which formerly had a hexagonal pond with a small island with aquatic plants in the center, which was later covered. In its upper part, the park has sablon esplanades that are used as sports courts, as well as an amphitheater, while a large part of the park is made up of a large forest mass of vegetation. On its grounds are the CEIP Antaviana school and the Ateneo Popular Nou Barris, as well as a theater school and a circus school.	
1992	Parc del Poblenou	11,92 ha	C/ Carmen Amaya-Passeig Calvell (Sant Martí)	It is located by the sea, on land adjacent to the Bogatell beach, between the Olympic Village and the Diagonal Mar area. It was created in 1992 with a project by Manuel Ruisánchez and Xavier Vendrell. The park is divided into two zones, a smaller one located between the Ronda del Litoral and the Cementiri de Poblenou, and separated by Llacuna Street, and a larger one located on the Ronda del Litoral, which in that section is underground. The first has a lake as its most distinctive element, and includes a school (CEIP Vila Olímpica) and a soccer field. The second is more rugged, with a predominance of vegetation, especially a pine forest. The part closest to the sea is made up of grass dunes, with walkways made from the crossbeams of the old train tracks, and includes as an anecdotal element the remains of a shipwreck. It is the Ashraf II, under the Lebanese flag, of which the smokestack and two pieces of the stern, one of the deck and the other with the propeller and rudder, remain stranded on land. Among its trees, the tamarisk stands out, a tree resistant to sea salinity and which serves as a fixation for the sand dunes on the beach.	
2007	Parc de la Primavera	1,95 ha	C/ Nou de la Rambla, 203 (Sants-Montjuic)	It is located between the neighborhood of El Poble-Sec and the northern slope of the mountain of Montjuic, next to the Mirador del Poble-Sec Park. It was created in 2007 with a project by Patrizia Falcone. It is an area of steep slope, resolved through a series of ramps and stairs. Under the ground of the park is a waste treatment center, the Parque de Limpieza de la Zona Sur, designed by architects Eileen Liebman and Fernando Villavecchia, built with the intention of placing a green area above it. Several chimneys of this complex protrude from the roof of the building and are harmoniously integrated into the upper garden as decorative elements of the park. The vegetation is typically Mediterranean, with white pines, poplars and willows. The park has a children's play area and another for dogs, and houses an outpatient clinic, the CAP Les Hortes. In its enclosure are the remains of an air raid shelter from the Civil War.	
1992	Parc del Port Olímpic	2,99 ha	Av. Litoral, 30 (Sant Martí)	This park, designed by the Martorell-Bohigas-Mackay-Puigdomènech team, is the result of the urban renewal carried out on the coastline for the 1992 Olympic Games, on land previously used for industrial purposes. At its entrance on the Place des Volontaires is the sculpture Marc (1997), by Robert Llimós, dedicated to his son who died in an accident. Then opens a long sablon promenade lined by the flagpoles that held the flags of all the countries participating in the Olympic Games. Next to it there are pergola-like gates with terracotta pots and children's play areas. Then there is a grassy area, where there is a monument to the Commemoration of the inauguration of the Olympic Village, consisting of a commemorative plaque and two steel plates in the shape of boat sails. Next to it is a restaurant with a pond that houses a sculpture of Cobi, the mascot of the Olympic Games, designed by Javier Mariscal. This is the area with the most vegetation, where some carob trees transplanted from a carob tree in Tarragona stand out, as well as a long bank of trencadís with undulating forms.	

=== R ===
Year	Name	Area	Location	Description	Photo
2016	Jardins de la Rambla de Sants	31 300 m^{2}	C/ Antoni de Capmany s/n (Sants-Montjuïc)	Designed by Ana Molino and Sergi Godia, they were inaugurated on August 20, 2016. The gardens are located on an elevated platform located over the train and metro tracks, in a stretch of 760 linear meters and an average width of 30. To facilitate mobility they have ramps, elevators and escalators. Considered the "first aerial boulevard in Barcelona", the gardens are between 6 and 14 meters above street level. They have been designed with sustainability criteria, with LED lighting, photovoltaic energy and groundwater irrigation. For the vegetation, preferably native species have been chosen, which are signposted with a botanical route. In the final part of the route, on the border with Hospitalet de Llobregat, there is a "didactic garden" that shows what the area was like in the 18th century. It includes an ornamental fountain with several jets and LED lights, an umbraculum that generates a multipurpose space of 660 m^{2}, a children's area, fitness equipment, toilets, a bar and a library park.	
2013	Parc de les Rieres d'Horta	4 ha	Av. de l'Estatut de Catalunya (Horta-Guinardó)	It is located on a cleaning park and rainwater tank, which is buried under the street. It has been designed with the highest criteria of sustainability, as can be seen in the energy produced by photovoltaic pergolas that supply the lighting network, which uses LED technology. Likewise, irrigation is done with groundwater, and the vegetation is all of Mediterranean type, optimally adapted to the environment. To learn more about this vegetation, there is a botanical tour with signs offering the scientific name of each species. The park is located in a hilly area, so it is divided into several terraces: on the upper terrace is the photovoltaic pergola, measuring 642 m^{2} and with a rated power of 66 kW, which is located above a series of petanque courts, to which it provides shade; on the second terrace there is a fitness circuit with equipment designed especially for the elderly; then another terrace houses a children's play area; finally, at the bottom there is a fountain with water fountains and a sablon square with a stage for popular festivals.	
1999	Jardins de Rosa Luxemburg	1,2 ha	Av. del Estatuto de Cataluña, 15-39 (Horta-Guinardó)	The gardens are located in the Vall d'Hebron neighborhood, near the Olympic area built for the 1992 Games. They were created in 1999 with a design by Patrizia Falcone, and are dedicated to the Marxist politician and theorist Rosa Luxemburg. They are located between two school facilities, the CEIP Pau Casals school and the L'Arquet kindergarten. As they are located in a terrain with a certain unevenness, they are structured in a system of terraces delimited by slopes and connected by stairs, as well as by a main path that runs through the whole enclosure. It is a quiet and cozy place, which invites to rest and meditation. The vegetation is of forest type, with a predominance of trees, some of them fruit trees and flowers. In the lower part there is a forest with a great variety of species, as well as an undergrowth of bushes. There are also aromatic plants. The garden includes a children's play area and a space for dogs.	

=== S ===
Year	Name	Area	Location	Description	Photo
1929	Gardens of Salvador Espriu (Jardinets de Gràcia)	0,32 ha	Passeig de Gracia, 118 (Gràcia)	These are popular gardens formerly known as Jardinets de Gràcia, until they were dedicated to Salvador Espriu in 1991, in memory of the poet who lived in front of them, at number 118 of Passeig de Gràcia . They were made in 1929 by Nicolás María Rubió y Tudurí. They are rectangular in shape, and their central part is occupied by long lawns, bordered by about twenty plane trees arranged in a row. In its upper part there is a fountain with water jets. In its space there are several works of public art: L'Empordà. New ode to Barcelona (1961), by Ernest Maragall i Noble; La Lectura. A Pompeu Fabra (1948), by Josep Clarà; and Surco. A Salvador Espriu (2014), by Frederic Amat.	
1979-1992	Parc de Sant Martí	6,80 ha	C/ Menorca, 64 (Sant Martí)	This park was developed in different phases: in 1979 work began on an original project by Nicolás María Rubió y Tudurí, although due to his death it was completed by the architects Antonio Armesto, Carles Martí and Miquel Sodupe, with the first phase completed in 1985 and the second in 1992. The park is structured in two zones: a square plaza framed by the streets Menorca, Huelva, Trabajo and Agricultura, which makes up a quarter of the total park; and the larger area, which is shaped like an irregular triangle, divided in turn into a green area with a lake and a perimeter area on the side of the street Menorca that houses various facilities and equipment: a soccer field, a market, a high school and the parish church of Sant Martí de Provençals. The area also contains three old masías, Ca l'Arnó, Can Planas and Can Cadena, which have been converted into civic spaces for the residents. The area next to the lake has large meadows with alders, aspens and poplars, which recall the agricultural past of the area, while the area with facilities has paved spaces and small squares with orange and olive trees, which also have children's playgrounds and sports courts.	
1992	Parc de Sant Pau del Camp	1,6 ha	C/ Sant Pau, 89-97 (Ciutat Vella)	This park is located around the Monastery of Sant Pau del Camp, in the neighborhood of El Raval. Founded at the end of the 9th century, it is one of the best preserved Romanesque buildings in the city. The park dates from 1992, with a design by Lluís Nadal, and has large grassy areas next to small groves of trees, mainly mulberry, poplar and tipuanas. Among these plant elements there are sandy squares, children's play areas and petanque courts, along with a system of circular paths dug into the ground and bordered by half-height walls, which give the sensation of walking through the vegetation. On one side stands a tall chimney from an old factory, which today is a vocational school. Next to the church there is also an urban vegetable garden.	

=== T ===
Year	Name	Area	Location	Description	Photo
1918	Jardins de la Tamarita	1,4 ha	Pº de Sant Gervasi, 47-49 (Sarrià-Sant Gervasi)	It was one of the first projects of Nicolás María Rubió y Tudurí. The gardens are divided into two areas: the gardens of the manor house and a forest hollow, enabled for children's play area. The most outstanding part is the one designed by Rubió as a recreational garden, with various areas that combine flowerbeds and hedges with fountains and statues, in two different styles: on the right a garden with a landscape style and romantic atmosphere, and on the left a classicist garden. At the entrance there is a pond with a fountain, figures of sleeping lions and climbing plants of the Muehlenbeckia complexa type; from here a path leads to a series of squares around the manor house, the work of Melcior Vinyals, which now houses the Blanquerna Foundation. In the main square in front of the building there are four sculptures dedicated to continents —all except Oceania—, the work of Virginio Arias, as well as a fountain with sculpted children, while in one of the surrounding squares there is a fountain with sculpted frogs that act as jets, and in another a waterfall made of rockwork and covered with seashells.	
1917-1924	Jardins del Teatre Grec	1,65 ha	Pº Santa Madrona, 38 (Sants-Montjuic)	They are located on the mountain of Montjuic, next to the Greek Theater, an open-air theater inspired by the ancient Greek theaters, designed by Ramon Reventós within the set of the International Exhibition of 1929. They were designed by Jean-Claude Nicolas Forestier in conjunction with the Laribal Gardens, between 1917 and 1924. They were formerly called Rosaleda de Amargós, in honor of Josep Amargós, the architect who designed the first urbanization project for Montjuic mountain. The area is divided into terraces: a first one with a rectangular floor plan and geometrically shaped flowerbeds with aromatic plants, next to a group of bitter orange trees; another one that serves as a viewpoint, with a pergola full of climbing plants; and finally the main level, where the theater is located. Here is the main part of the gardens, with several geometric flowerbeds that form a mosaic, planted with different varieties of roses, and with a fountain in the center. On one of the sides there is a pond with aquatic plants. On an upper level is a pavilion that serves as a restaurant, in front of which is a pool with water fountains.	
1987	Jardins de Torre de les Aigües	0,16 ha	C/ Roger de Lauria, 56 (Eixample)	They are located inside a block of blocks of apartments located between the streets Consejo de Ciento, Diputación, Roger de Lauria and Bruch, one of the few examples of block interiors landscaped as Ildefonso Cerdá, the author of the project of the Eixample of Barcelona, wanted. The most outstanding element that gives its name to the garden is a tall brick tower built in 1867 by Josep Oriol Mestres to supply drinking water to the right side of the Ensanche. Nowadays it stands in the middle of a swimming pool that in summer is enabled for the neighbors to bathe. Around it is a space with sand and a paved square, and the plant presence is provided by magnificent magnolia trees that shade the secluded space. The set, enabled as a public garden in 1987, also houses a bar and showers and changing rooms as a complement to the pool.	
1860	Jardins de Torre Girona	3 ha	C/ de John Maynard Keynes 30 (Les Corts)	It was once the summer estate of the banker and politician Manuel Girona y Agrafel, mayor of Barcelona between 1876 and 1877, and consisted of a neoclassical style house by Josep Oriol Mestres and romantic style gardens, which included a lake with a windmill, Chinese pavilions and various sculptures. In 1940 a classicist style chapel was built next to the house. The land now belongs to the Polytechnic University of Catalonia (UPC), which houses its rectorate in the old house, while the chapel houses the Barcelona Supercomputing Center (BSC), which includes the MareNostrum 4 supercomputer. In 2019, the UPC and the Barcelona City Council signed an agreement to cede the gardens with a view to establishing a public park. The gardens house a faithful replica of the Cabeza colosal olmeca 1, the original of which is housed in the Xalapa Museum of Anthropology (Veracruz, Mexico).	
2013	Parc Torrent Maduixer	0,41 ha	C/ de Josep Garí, 7 (Sarrià-Sant Gervasi)	It is located in the foothills of the Sierra de Collserola, next to the Ronda de Dalt. The park is located on the roof of a building of the maintenance and cleaning area of the Barcelona City Council, built with criteria of efficiency and sustainability, as it has a geothermal pump for energy consumption, which offers high performance with low power consumption. The terrain has a 9-meter slope, so it is organized in a series of five terraces that bridge the height difference, connected with stairs and paved paths. These terraces generate a series of small squares of sablon, and between them there are slopes covered with vegetation, mainly shrubs, ground cover and climbing plants, as well as some Mediterranean type trees. Irrigation is automatic, and is carried out by means of an electrovalve programmer. In the upper part of the park there is an urban vegetable garden, and in the lower part there is a children's play area.	
En desarrollo	Parc dels Tres Turons	122 ha	Gràcia and Horta-Guinardó districts	These are three hills belonging to the Litoral mountain range that overhang the Barcelona plain, and form a privileged balcony with magnificent views of the city: they are the Turó de la Creueta del Coll, the Turó del Carmel and the Turó de la Rovira; the first belongs administratively to the district of Gràcia, while the other two belong to the district of Horta-Guinardó. Since 1953 the Barcelona City Council has planned to create in this area a large green area that would serve as a lung for the city, and as a leisure and rest center for residents and tourists. However, since then the plan has not yet been fully implemented, partly due to the resistance of some neighborhood associations, since the final project foresees the demolition of several residential buildings located on the grounds of the future park. Each of the three hills has its own green area: the Turó de la Creueta del Coll the Creueta del Coll Park, the Turó del Carmel the Carmel Park and the Turó de la Rovira the Guinardó Park.	
1995	Jardins de les Tres Xemeneies	0,90 ha	Paralelo Avenue, 49 (Sants-Montjuic)	These gardens with a distinctly urban appearance are located on the land formerly occupied by the Barcelona Traction, Light and Power Company, limited —popularly known as La Canadiense—, one of the pioneers in the city. They were created in 1995 with a design by Pere Riera and Josep Maria Gutiérrez. Of the old power plant, only the chimneys (dated 1897, 1908 and 1917) remain, surrounded today by a FECSA office building. Next to it are several paved plazas separated by cement walls decorated with graffiti. One of these squares is set up for skateboarding, next to which there is a cube that serves as a stage for open-air shows. Scattered around the grounds are several pieces of the old power plant that have been preserved and placed as sculptures, such as a boiler and electric turbines, as well as a huge concrete chair at the entrance to the park, designed by the architects who designed the project. At one end of the park there is an area with a sablon floor, where there is a children's play area, petanque courts and ping-pong tables. On this side are planted a series of poplars, which is the only plant species in the park.	
1993	Vivero de Tres Pins	8,80 ha	Miramar Avenue, s/n (Sants-Montjuic)	It is the nursery of new plants of the Institute of Parks and Gardens of Barcelona, where all kinds of species are grown to be transferred to other parks in the city. It is located on the northwest slope of Montjuic mountain, and occupies a large space located between the Montjuic Olympic Stadium and Montjuic Castle, next to the Botanical Garden of Barcelona and the Gardens of Mossèn Cinto Verdaguer. It was founded in the 1920s to supply plants for the 1929 International Exposition. In 1985 its grounds were enlarged, and in 1993 it was opened to the public, after a remodeling carried out by Enric Batlle and Joan Roig. On its grounds is also the Petra Kelly Garden, dedicated to the German ecologist Petra Kelly, founder of the Green Party, in which there are two small monuments: A Petra Kelly (1993), by Olga Ricart; and A Joseph Beuys (1992), by Lluís Boada and Carles Hac Mor, a stone monolith dedicated to the German artist Joseph Beuys, a staunch defender of environmentalism.	
1993	Parc de la Trinitat	7,04 ha	Via de Bàrcino, s/n (Sant Andreu)	This park is located within the space formed by the Nus de la Trinitat, an important road axis that connects the Ronda de Dalt with the Ronda del Litoral, bordering the municipality of Santa Coloma de Gramanet. It was created by Enric Batlle and Joan Roig in 1993. With 14,000 trees, the creation of the park placed the district of Sant Andreu in fifth place in number of trees per district in the city. In the center of the park stands a hill populated with trees, designed to muffle the noise of traffic. At its foot lies a 245 m long, semicircular lake, which was originally navigable, although nowadays there are no more boats. From the lake stands out the sculpture Woman bathing, by Rafael Bartolozzi, while in the wooded area there is a sculptural frieze of Rampaging Horses, by Joaquim Ros i Sabaté. There is also an amphitheater for 500 people, an urban orchard, picnic area with barbecues, bar, sports areas, children's area and a model car track.	
1936	Parc Turó de la Peira	7,71 ha	Pº Fabra i Puig, 396-408 (Nou Barris)	This park is located on the hill of the same name, one of the foothills of the Sierra de Collserola. The original project comes from the purchase of an estate known as Can Peguera from the Marquise de Castellvell in 1933. The landscaping project, from 1936, was the work of Lluís Riudor. Later, after several decades of neglect, it was restored by Joaquim Casamor in 1977. The park has large forest areas, including a lush pine forest, and is structured on different levels due to the orography of the terrain, linked by macadam paths. There are also grassy areas, and a steeply sloping area houses a small collection of cacti. At the top of the hill, with magnificent views of the city, stands a tall iron cross. The park has a children's playground, picnic area, petanque courts, ping-pong tables and a dog area.	
1970	Jardins del Turó del Putxet	3,97 ha	C/ Manacor, s/n (Sarrià-Sant Gervasi)	The Putxet hill, 178 meters high, belongs to the foothills of Tibidabo (Sierra de Collserola). This area was urbanized and converted into a public park in 1970, with a project by Joaquim Casamor. In the past, a chapel from the 17th century was located in this place. The area began to be populated around 1870, with the construction of several summer residences for the Barcelona bourgeoisie. The grounds of the gardens belonged to an old estate called Torre Espanya, belonging to the Morató family. In 1917 the area was included in a plan for the preservation of green areas, although it was not until 1970 that it was formalized as a public park. The gardens have a lookout point, a geodesic observatory and a weather station at the top of the hill, as well as a picnic area, a children's play area, a dog area, petanque courts, ping-pong tables and public toilets. The paths are made of macadam, surrounded by lush vegetation, preferably of Mediterranean type. In 2011 the park was enlarged by Patrizia Falcone.	
1934	Turó Parc	2,88 ha	Pau Casals avenue, 19 (Sarrià-Sant Gervasi)	The official name of the park is Jardins de Eduard Marquina, but it is better known as Turó Park, after a former amusement park on the site (1912–1929), owned by the Bertrand-Girona family. The park was inaugurated in 1934, with a design by Nicolás María Rubió y Tudurí. At the main entrance there is a Monument to Pau Casals, a work by Apel-les Fenosa, which leads to a circular plaza bordered by holm oaks trimmed in topiary, from which five radial axes lead to different areas of the park. The vegetation is composed of 38 species of trees, including a grove of holm oaks and a grove of false pepper trees, as well as a meadow with lime trees. On one side there is an oval pond filled with water lilies and surrounded by poplars and plane trees, perhaps the most characteristic element of the park, from the old amusement park and Rubió respected when remodeling the area. There is also an outdoor theater, and in the center of the park is the so-called parterre of Boulangrin, with a pool of Arabian appearance and surrounded by magnolias. There are several sculptures in the grounds: A Francesc Viñas, by Josep Clarà; Helios, biga de la fuente de la Aurora, by Joan Borrell i Nicolau; La bien plantada, by Eloïsa Cerdan; and Un oiseau, by Jean-Michel Folon. Scattered throughout the grounds are also panels with poems by authors such as Dylan Thomas, Walt Whitman, Salvador Espriu, Joan Vinyoli, Alfonsina Storni, Fernando Pessoa and Federico García Lorca, which constitute a poetic itinerary in the open air.	

=== U ===
Year	Name	Area	Location	Description	Photo
1924	Jardins de l'Umbracle		Passeig de Santa Madrona (Sants-Montjuïc)	They are located on the mountain of Montjuic, and were built between 1917 and 1924, on the occasion of the International Exhibition of Barcelona in 1929, being the work of Jean-Claude Nicolas Forestier and Nicolás María Rubió Tudurí. Its name comes from the Umbráculo de la Font del Gat, a greenhouse that disappeared in a fire in the 1960s. In its central part there is a circular pond with a central fountain, behind which are the remains of the old umbraculum, of which the walls remain, with openings in the form of semicircular arches at the front. This umbraculum was built in 1928, with a design by Rubió i Tudurí, semicircular in shape, with a porticoed gallery and lattice ceilings. In 1929 a sculpture entitled Marinada or Danzarina, by Antoni Alsina, representing a nude young woman dancing, in the noucentist style, was placed here.	
1859	Jardins de Universitat de Barcelona	1,08 ha	C/ Diputación, 230 (Eixample)	The set of gardens of the University of Barcelona was created at the same time as the building, in 1859, by the architect Elías Rogent. It is made up of the landscaped areas of the side cloisters of the building, as well as —to the greatest extent— the botanical garden located at the rear of the architectural complex. Its original purpose was as a botanical garden for students, although in 1995 it was opened to the general public, when the gardens were dedicated to the historian Ferran Soldevila. It is an intimate, secluded place, an oasis in the midst of the surrounding urbanism. In addition to its magnificent collection of exotic plants and species, there is a greenhouse that houses the most delicate species. It also contains a pond with fish and frogs, and several fountains and fountains, so the presence of water is paramount in the whole.	

=== V ===
Year	Name	Area	Location	Description	Photo
1992	Parc de la Vall d'Hebron	8,22 ha	Plaça de la Clota (Horta-Guinardó)	It is located in the neighborhood of the same name, and was created in 1992 in the context of the Olympic Games, with a project developed by Eduard Bru. It is a heterogeneous space that links various green spots in the area, located between the different sports facilities built for the Games. It is structured in a series of squares at different levels, some shaded with pergolas, while other spaces host a rural-looking vegetation, such as reedbeds and hills upholstered with ivy. It was built with a post-modern style design, which is evident in details such as the rubber pavement in some areas, which sinks when stepped on as if it were natural terrain, or the use in some places of synthetic grass, in colors as unique as yellow. Within the park is a replica of the Pavilion of the Spanish Republic built for the International Exhibition of Paris in 1937, the work of architects Josep Lluís Sert and Luis Lacasa, where Picasso's Guernica was exhibited for the first time. It also houses three large sculptures: Form and Space, by Eudald Serra; Tell me, tell me, dear, by Susana Solano; and Matches, by Claes Oldenburg.	
1970	Jardins de Vil·la Amèlia	2,33 ha	C/ de Eduardo Conde, 22 (Sarrià-Sant Gervasi)	On this land was formerly the Quinta Amelia, a part of the Girona family estate, which was expropriated in 1969. The name comes from Amelia de Vilanova, wife of Ignacio Girona. It was then remodeled by Joaquim Casamor, who respected the winding layout of the paths and the shape of the flowerbeds. The focal point of the park is a circular pond, in the center of which there is a small island with the sculpture Dríade, by Ricard Sala. Next to the pond there is a promontory that serves as a viewpoint —formerly a waterfall—, surrounded by cypresses. Among the plant species it is worth mentioning several centenary trees, such as a eucalyptus that is part of the Catalog of Trees of Local Interest of Barcelona. Next to a Passeig de palms washingtonias is the statue The snake charmer, by Jules Anthone (1887). There is also an earthen hill with old white pines, and a children's play area lined with love trees.	
1986	Jardins de Vil·la Cecília	1,47 ha	C/ de Eduardo Conde, 42 (Sarrià-Sant Gervasi)	This land was part of the Girona family estate next to Villa Amelia, and was later owned by Eduardo Conde, founder of Almacenes El Siglo, whose house is still preserved as the Casal de Sarrià civic center. The name comes from Cecilia Gómez del Olmo, Conde's wife. It was created in 1986 with a project by José Antonio Martínez Lapeña and Elías Torres, whose design was awarded the FAD prize that year. The gardens have a postmodern style, with a somewhat labyrinthine structure, which seeks to enhance the various squares that punctuate the enclosure. Of the street furniture, the benches, similar to large colorful scooters, and the lampposts, with tree-like shapes, stand out. At the entrance on Santa Amelia Street there is a metal fence that imitates the leaves of the Ginkgo biloba tree, and next to it is a water channel in the center of which stands the sculpture Ophelia drowned, by Francisco López Hernández (1964), in allusion to the Ophelia of Shakespeare's Hamlet.	

=== W ===
Year	Name	Area	Location	Description	Photo
2012	Jardins de Winston Churchill	0,07 ha	Ronda del General Mitre 69–71, / Vía Augusta, 257 (Sarrià-Sant Gervasi)	They are located at the lower corner of the intersection of Via Augusta 257 and Ronda del General Mitre 69–71, in the district of Sarrià-Sant Gervasi and, more specifically, in the neighborhood of Las Tres Torres, very close to the Las Tres Torres FGC station. They were inaugurated on December 15, 2012. With a total area of 0.07 ha, they contain grass parterres, sandy areas and hard paving. The site pays tribute to Winston Churchill, British politician and writer, Prime Minister of the United Kingdom during World War II and the post-war years, as well as Nobel Prize for Literature in 1953. At one of its ends there is a sculpture in the form of a basalt stone monolith, 2.20 m high, with the sculpted effigy of the prime minister, dressed in his characteristic bow tie, the work of sculptor Pep Codó, made in 2012. The plant species planted are abelia grandiflora, white poplar, common ivy, lantana camara, magnolia, hawthorn and privet.	

=== X ===
Year	Name	Area	Location	Description	Photo
2007	Parc de Xavier Montsalvatge	2 ha	C/ Síndic Rahola (Horta-Guinardó)	The park is located above the Ronda de Dalt, on the border with the Sierra de Collserola. It was created in 2007 with a project by Jaime Coll and Judith Leclerc. It is dedicated to the composer Xavier Montsalvatge, National Music Prize in 1985. It is located on the Horta depot, a bus parking lot of Transports Metropolitans de Barcelona. When the depot was built, the construction of an ecological roof was already foreseen, which takes advantage of the slope of the land and is at street level in its upper area. At the same time as a park, this roof serves to collect rainwater through a system of concrete funnels that channel the water to a central drain. These funnels, circular in shape, mark the topography of the terrain, as they create a series of islands of different configurations, some hard and others of grass or other types of vegetation, creating a tapestry of various shades of color. On the other hand, the different materials used generate two types of landscape: a cold one, derived from concrete, sand, marble and ivy, ideal for activities such as skating, bike trails or remote-controlled cars; and a warm one, derived from rubber, grass and vines, designed for leisure, walking or picnics.	

== See also ==
- Gardening in Spain
- History of Barcelona
- Public art in Barcelona
- Street furniture in Barcelona
- Urban planning of Barcelona
