= Parc de la Creueta del Coll =

Park in Barcelona, Catalonia, Spain

Coordinates: 41.4189°N 2.14667°E

Parc de la Creueta del Coll (IPA: [ˈpaɾɡ də lə kɾəˈwɛtə ðəl ˈkɔʎ], 'Park of the Little Cross on the Pass') is a park in the Gràcia and Horta districts of Barcelona, Catalonia, Spain. The park was created from an abandoned quarry as part of the nou urbanisme (new urban planning) developments during the 1992 Summer Olympics by architects Martorell, Bohigas and Mackay.

The park contains the sculpture Elogi de l'Aigua ('In Praise of Water', 1987), by Basque sculptor Eduardo Chillida, a massive, reinforced concrete claw suspended by steel cables above a shallow pool built in the former quarry area.

Another sculpture, Tòtem (English: Totem, 1987) by Ellsworth Kelly is near the entrance gate.

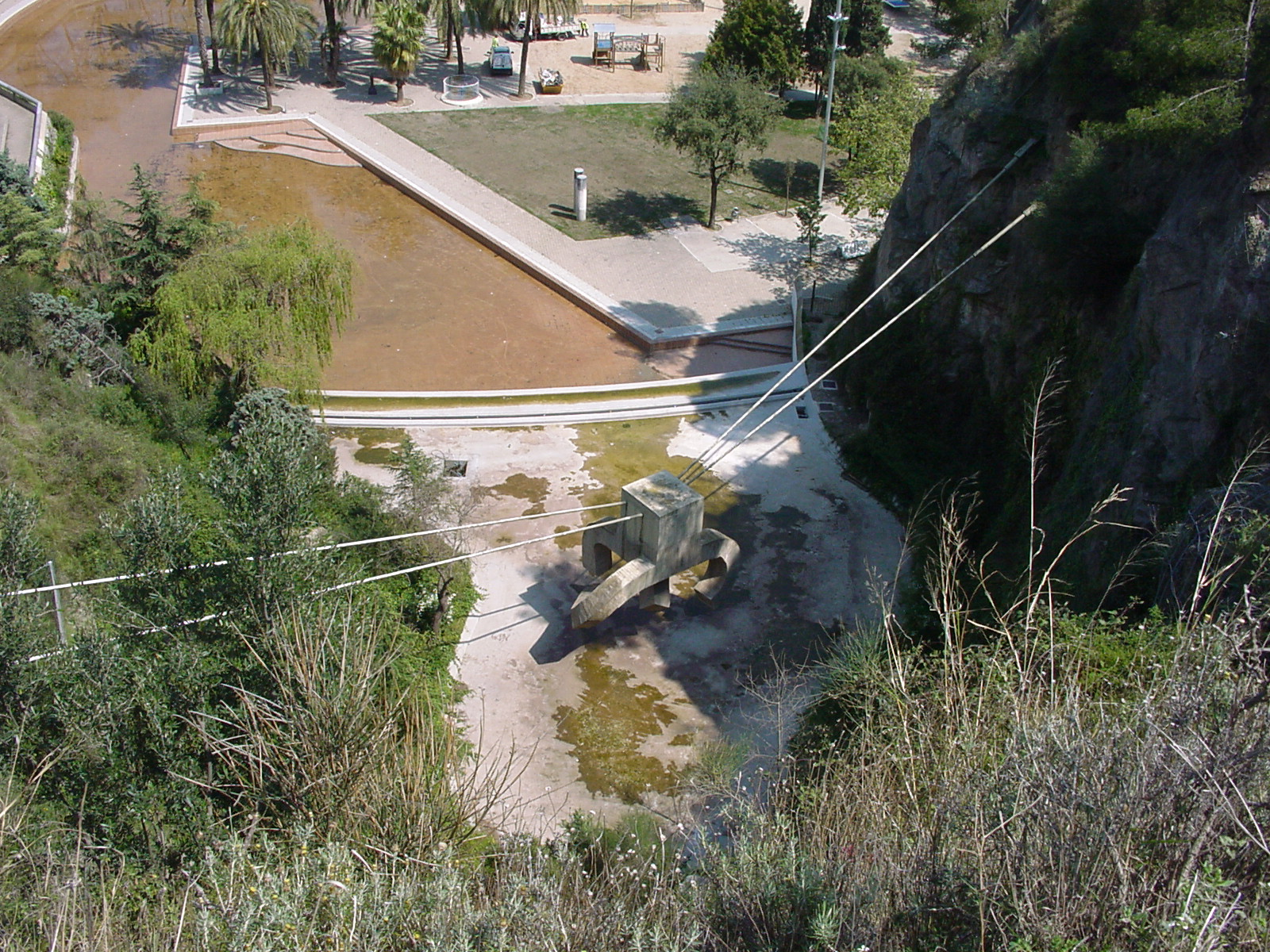
Looking down onto the claw from the rim of the park

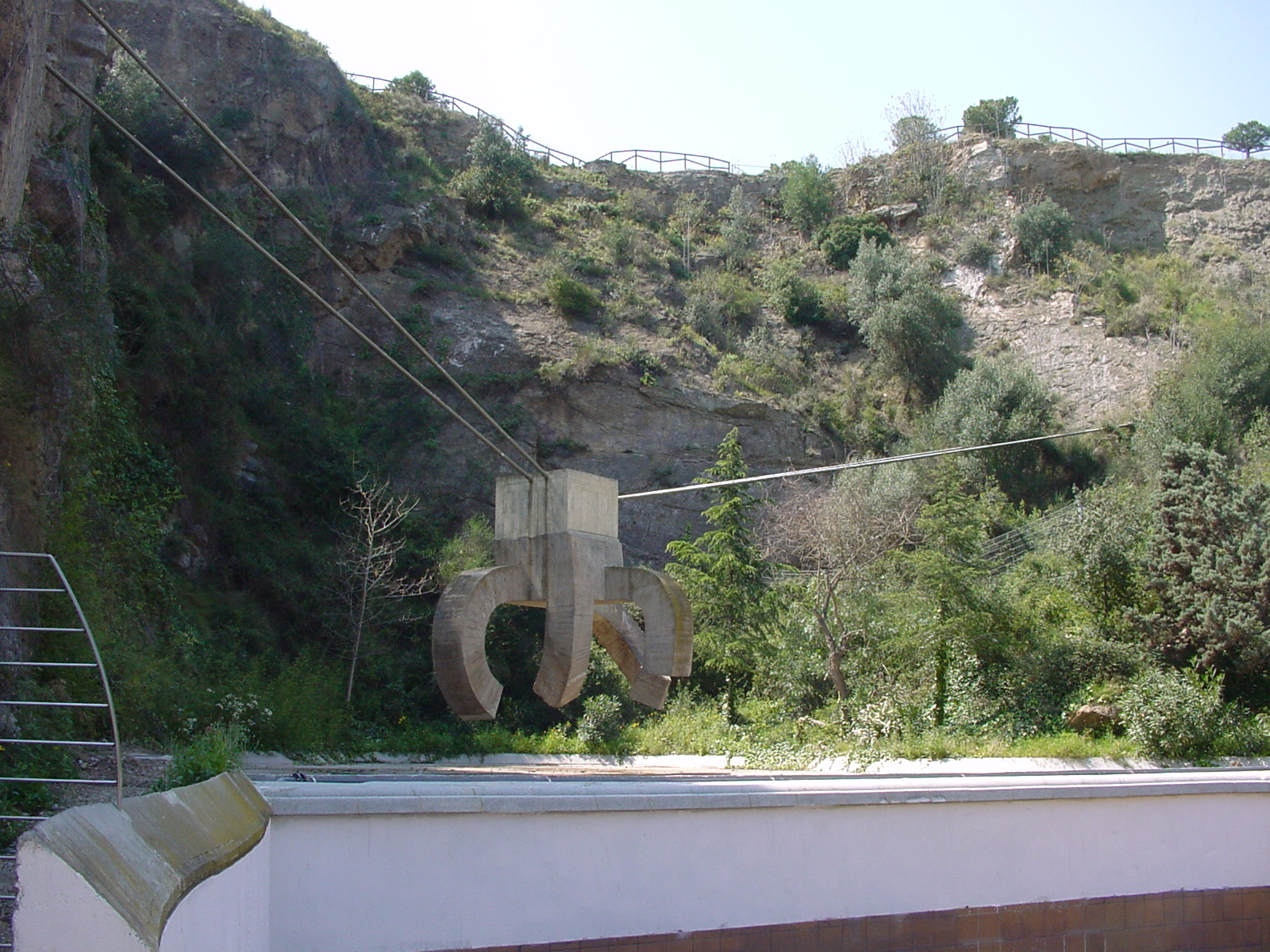
Elogi de l'Aigua by Chillida

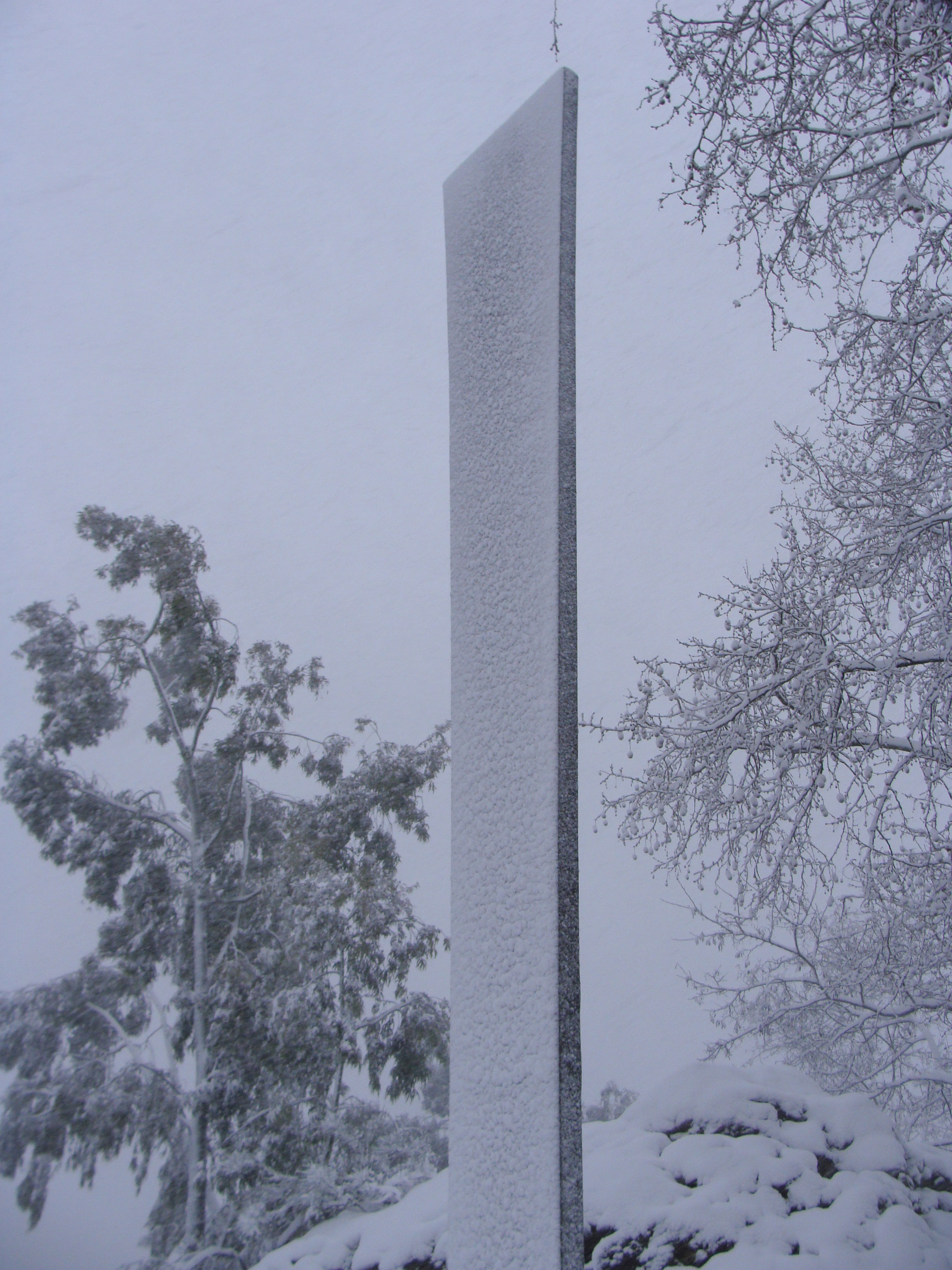
Totem by Kelly
