= Font del Gat =

Fountain in Barcelona, Spain

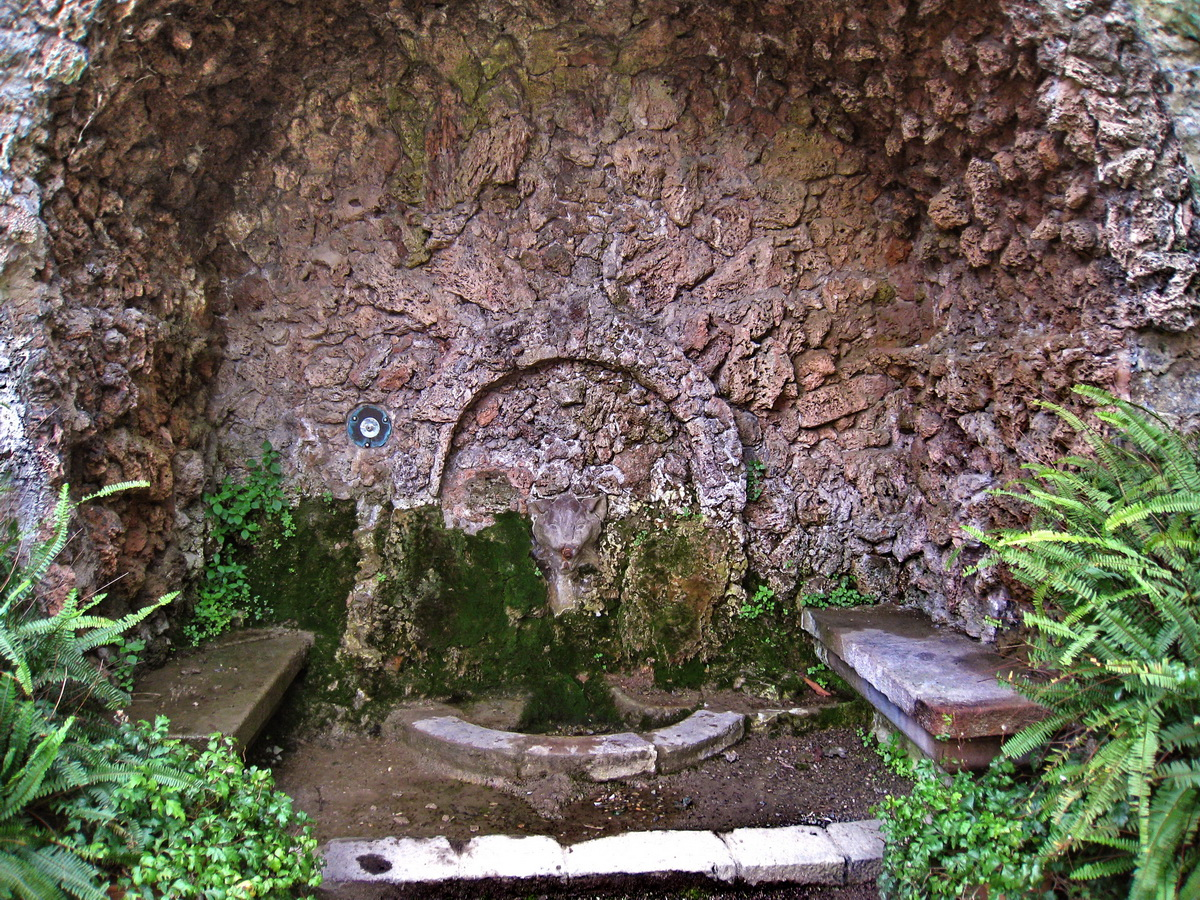
Font del Gat

Font del Gat is a fountain in Barcelona included in the Inventory of the Architectural Heritage of Catalonia. Font del Gat translates to Cat's Fountain in English.

It is located within the Jardins de Laribal, in Montjuïc. The fountain is located inside an arch made of rough stone. It is located in an area of gardens, stairways and fountains that lead from the Santa Madrona promenade to the fountain. The whole of the gardens occupies the slope that goes from the highest part of the Laribal Gardens to the Paseo de Santa Madrona. It is a set of paths, terraces and corners that adapt to the relief of the terrain with a gazebo, stairs, ramps and a monumental waterfall with four sections separated by paths and channels.

== Description ==
La Font del Gat, one of the most popular places in Montjuïc, is located in Laribal Gardens. The name is due to the Laribal family, former owner. In 1908, it became one of the first public gardens in the city and since the beginning of the 20th century in one of the most frequented snack bars in the city with Font del Gat as the centre of the meetings.

Between 1916 and 1918, Jean-Claude Nicolas Forestier with Nicolau M. Rubió and Tudurí as an assistant, directed from a project the development and conditioning of the garden of Laribal, other neighbouring areas and also the space of Roserar. Forestier left Montjuïc in 1919, because of his differences with Josep Puig i Cadafalch and finally it was Rubió i Tudurí who finished executing the works, which introduced some important changes regarding the initial project. In the Laribal's garden, the space of the Font del Gat was renewed and the head of a carved cat by Josep Antoni Homs was placed as a spurter. There is little information and documentation about Font del Gat prior to the Forestier project but it seems that for centuries there has been a fountain in the same location.

Laribal Garden includes three sectors with differences in level and topography: at the lowest level there are the gardens of Josep Amargós where there is the Teatre Grec, in the intermediate sector there is Font del Gat and the area called Colla de l'Arròs, and in the highest level we find a lattice landscaping.

Subsequently, around 1925, Puig i Cadafalch built next to the fountain a restaurant where large family celebrations such as baptisms or communions could take place. The space has a fenced enclosure, originally it was private, which is accessed through a portal with a half-point arch at the end of long stairs. In the pine wood an oval panel shows two symmetrical black cats, on the card, there is the inscription "1884" and, therefore, before the intervention of Puig i Cadafalch.

== The song ==
The Font del Gat is known for the song La Marieta de l'ull viu. (Marieta the Forethoughtful )

Catalan	English
Baixant de la font del Gat una noia, una noia,	Down from the cat's fountain a maiden, a maiden,
baixant de la font del Gat una noia i un soldat.	down from the cat's fountain a maiden and a soldier.
Pregunteu-li com se diu, Marieta, Marieta,	Ask him what is her name, Marieta, Marieta,
Pregunteu-li com se diu, Marieta de l'Ull Viu.	ask him what is her name, Marieta the Forethoughtful.
