= Joan Roig i Diggle =

Blessed Joan Roig i Diggle
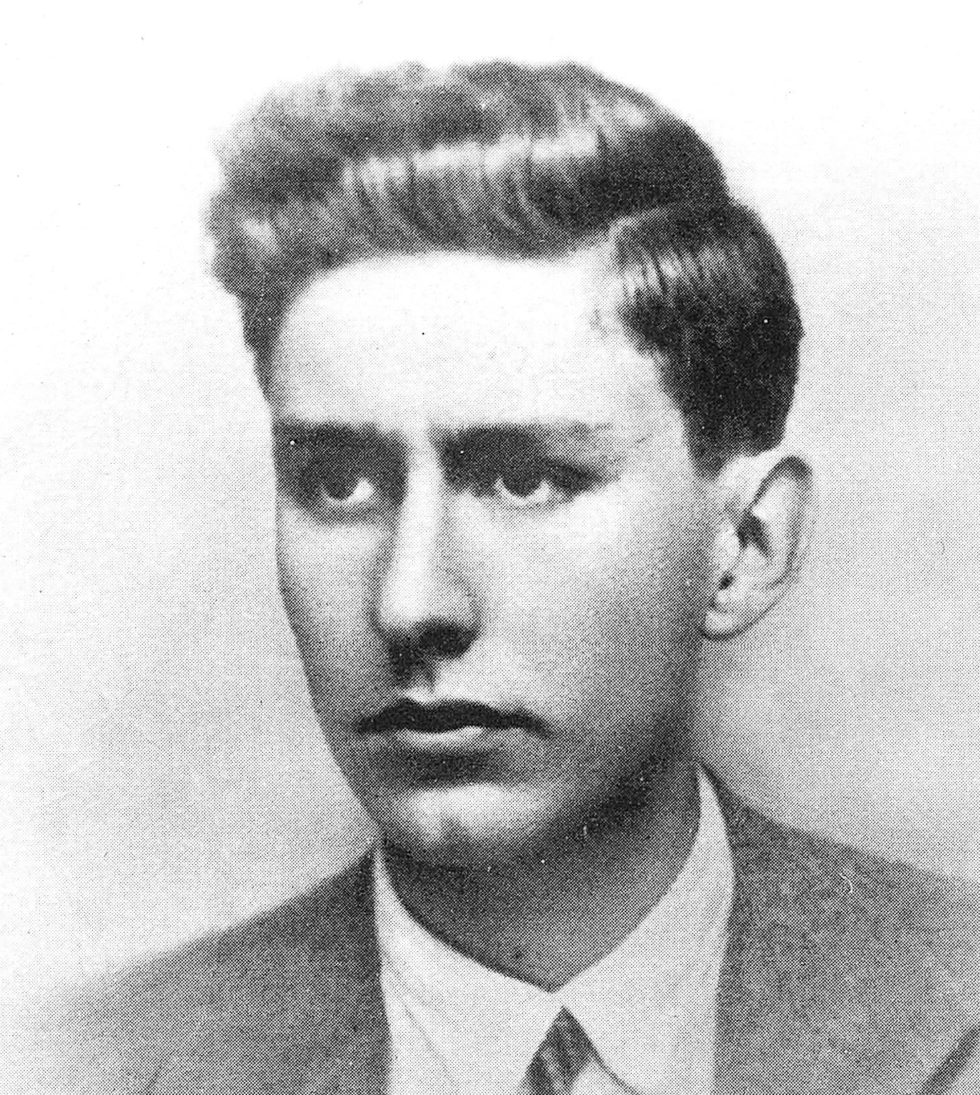

Martyr
- Born: 12 May 1917; Barcelona, Spanish Kingdom
- Died: 11 September 1936 (aged 19); Sant Coloma de Gramenet, Barcelona, Second Spanish Republic
- Venerated in: Roman Catholic Church
- Beatified: 7 November 2020, Sagrada Família, Barcelona, Spain by Cardinal Juan José Omella i Omella
- Feast: 11 September
- Patronage: Persecuted Christians, Catalonia

Joan Roig i Diggle (Note: He is sometimes also referred to with the first names John or Juan, the English and Spanish equivalents of the Catalan Joan.) (Catalan pronunciation: [ʒuˈan ˈrɔtʃ i ˈðiɡlə, -ɡəl]; 12 May 1917 – 11 September 1936) was a Spanish Roman Catholic and a member of the Federation of Young Christians of Catalonia. Roig did his education in Barcelona before he moved to complete it under the La Salle Brothers and Piarists in El Masnou. He hoped to pursue law during his schooling but had to do work in warehouses in order to support his father who lost his job due to a financial situation in his workplace. He delivered communion to the old and sick and was known for offering them comfort during dark times; this increased during the Spanish Civil War when it became uncertain as to the fate for priests and religious. Roig spoke out against communism which made him an opponent to the regime; he was arrested and killed soon after for his religious convictions.

The beatification process for him launched in Barcelona in late 1998 that saw him named as a Servant of God. Pope Francis confirmed his beatification after determining that Roig had been killed in hatred for his faith; Roig was beatified in Barcelona in the Sagrada Família on 7 November 2020.

== Life ==
Joan Roig i Diggle was born in Barcelona on 12 May 1917 as one of three children born to Ramon Roig i Font (Note: He is sometimes also referred to with the castilianized translation of his name Ramón Roig Fuente.) and Maud Diggle Puckering; he was born in his parents' home at Carrer de Mallorca 310. His sisters were Beatriu (Note: She is sometimes also referred to with the castilianized translation of her fame name Beatriz.) and Lourdes. His mother had British parents. He was baptized in the Immaculate Conception parish church.

He once expressed his desire to join the missions since he wanted to be able to help people and deliver the Gospel message to them through evangelization. His mother was alarmed and tried to convince Roig that it might not be safe for him to go to such mission regions.

Roig did his education first under the La Salle Brothers (1920-27) before the Piarists (1927-34) oversaw the remainder; he was a student under Ignasi Casanovas i Perramon and Francesc Carceller i Galindo. He made his First Communion alongside his sister Beatriu in 1924. But the Roiges had been forced to relocate to El Masnou where he had to find a job since financial difficulties had seen his father and others lose their jobs back in Barcelona. Roig had to do work while still in school (he hoped to enter law following his schooling) and first worked as a store clerk before working in at least two different warehouses such as a tissue warehouse. Roig soon joined the Federación de Jóvenes Cristianos de Cataluña in El Masnou before later being asked to run a branch of the group for those children under the age of fourteen. He also spent hours in Eucharistic Adoration and soon befriended Pere Tarrés i Claret before the latter entered the priesthood. He later began bringing communion to those infirm in their homes but also tended to the ill and the old. He offered them comfort in their suffering and in some cases helped those facing death prepare for it. In his private life he attended Mass each morning at 5am before heading off to work. Monsignor Pere Llumà became his spiritual director and heard his confession once each week.

He submitted an article to the magazine Flama on 6 March 1936 in which he commented on the most recent elections before denouncing fascism and communism in politics. He knew that this would pit him against the regime and that he could be arrested. The outbreak of the civil war just four months later saw his father go to hide at a brother's house as Joan himself hid with some friends between 25 July and 5 August before deciding to go back to work and move in with his mother. He feared for the state of his nation and each night clutched a Crucifix in his hands begging for strength for all Christians during the uncertain times. He received permission on 10 September 1936 from his spiritual director to keep Eucharistic hosts in case of emergencies so that could distribute it to those that needed it. He warned his director that he would go to France to receive the Eucharist himself if he was not given permission.

Masked militiamen came to his home to arrest him for his faith on 10 September 1936. His mother heard a car braking hard before hard knocks on the door came. His mother distracted them as he consumed all the hosts he had in order to prevent desecration. He kissed his mother farewell and told her in English that "God is with me" before leaving with his captors. He was forced to remain in the car as the men searched his uncle's house looking for his father to find that he was not there. He died forgiving them for their actions. Roig was killed near dawn on 11 September after being shot five times to the chest and once to the head. Roig's remains were found in 1938 and interred in a chapel in the Sant Pere del Masnou parish church.

== Beatification ==
The process for his beatification commenced in 1993 after petitions were sent to the Barcelona archdiocese to launch the process. The formal request was made that saw the Congregation for the Causes of Saints in Rome deliver the "nihil obstat" (no objections) on 19 August 1998. The diocesan investigation into his life opened under Cardinal Ricardo María Carles Gordó on 4 October 1999; documentation and witness interrogatories were collected before the cardinal closed the investigation on 16 May 2001. The archdiocese later submitted all their findings to the C.C.S. in Rome before the department issued a decree of validation on 6 June 2003 that said that the rules and guidelines had been followed and that all the documentation had been received.

The postulation (officials in charge of the cause) compiled the official "Positio" dossier that highlighted his life and demonstrated how he was a saint before submitting it to the C.C.S. in 2006. Theologians met and approved the cause after reviewing the dossier on 19 March 2019 before the cardinal and bishop members of the C.C.S. also approved it on 1 October 2019. Pope Francis approved his beatification the following morning after confirming that Roig had died "in odium fidei" (because of hatred of the faith). Cardinal Juan José Omella Omella beatified Roig at the Sagrada Família basilica on 7 November 2020 on the behalf of the pope.

The current postulator for this cause is the Piarist priest Andrés Valencia Henao.
