= Tom Carr (artist) =

Spanish sculptor

- Born: 8 January 1956; Tarragona, Spain
- Website: www.tomcarrstudio.com

Tom Carr (born 8 January 1956) is a sculptor who works in Spain.

== Biography ==
Carr was born in Tarragona, Spain, but spent his teenage years in the USA.

His first solo exhibition in the USA was in 1989 at the Jan Baum Gallery in Los Angeles. His painted wood sculptures included a 12-feet high, walk-in installation entitled ""Wall with Passageway".
