= David Mackay (architect) =

British architect

David John Mackay
- Born: 25 December 1933; Eastbourne, Sussex, England
- Died: 12 November 2014; Barcelona, Spain
- Occupation: Architect
- Spouse: Roser Jarque

David John Mackay (1933 – 2014) was a British architect and partner at MBM, an architecture firm based in Barcelona, Catalonia, Spain. He was mostly active in Catalonia.

== Biography ==
David John Mackay was born on 25 December 1933 in Eastbourne, Sussex, England. His father was a "colonial administrator" in India and Ghana, and his parents mostly lived abroad. Mackay was the youngest child in the family and attended boarding schools in England, Ireland and Scotland. In 1957, he married Catalan Roser Jarque, whom he met in London. In 1958, Mackay and Roser moved to Barcelona after college.

== Career ==
He was mostly active in designing in Catalonia, where among other projects he worked on the design for the renovation of the port area of Barcelona, and the design and construction of the Olympic Village there in 1992. One of MBM's latest projects is the construction of the Disseny Hub Barcelona centre and museum building, which officially opened in December, 2014, shortly after David Mackay died.

From 2003 he was the lead architect for "A Vision for Plymouth", otherwise known as the "Mackay Vision", which is a major plan for the renovation of the city of Plymouth, England. The plan will involve demolition of the Plymouth Pavilions entertainment arena.

In 2013 his last book, "On Life and Architecture", was published by the Royal Incorporation of Architects in Scotland (RIAS). In 2004 Mackay was awarded an Honorary Doctorate of Arts from Plymouth University. Mackay died on 12 November 2014 in Barcelona.
