= MBM (architecture firm) =

MBM ARQUITECTES is an architecture and urban design Spanish firm founded in 1951, and named from the initials of the last names of the three founder partners Josep Martorell, Oriol Bohigas and David Mackay. Since 2000 the firm incorporates two young architects: Oriol Capdevila and Francesc Gual, who join the firm. All of them are Spanish and Mackay, who died in November 2014, was English-Irish.

== History ==
The firm was one of the only exponents of modernism under Francisco Franco and served as a launching pad for many Spanish architects. The team also wrote, edited, published and lectured, promoting a modernist take on regionalism and designed many schools, libraries, housing projects, offices buildings and churches.

MBM did "pioneering" work in transforming Barcelona’s public spaces during the 1980s and earned a worldwide reputation the firm.

== Barcelona Olympics ==
MBM did design work for the Barcelona Olympics in 1992 including on the city's masterplan. The firm designed the Vila Olímpica, the Olympic Park (Parc del Litoral) and the Olympic Port. Their urban plan expanded the number of public spaces and cultural buildings and integrated the works of other major architects including Norman Foster and Richard Meier that helped achieve an "urban renaissance".

== Recent work ==
The firm showed 32 design projects that were never built at their 2003 Lost Architectures exhibit at the RIAI’s architecture centre in Dublin. The exhibit offered "a rare opportunity to reflect on the reasons, the trends, and the architectural culture of the time." In a comparison to Le Corbusier's speech when he received the Royal Gold Medal for Architecture in London in 1953 and "spoke of his failures", Mackay said, "Now, after 50 years of architecture, we are guilty of the crime of being on the scene too long. This has given us, too, the opportunity to accumulate many failures."

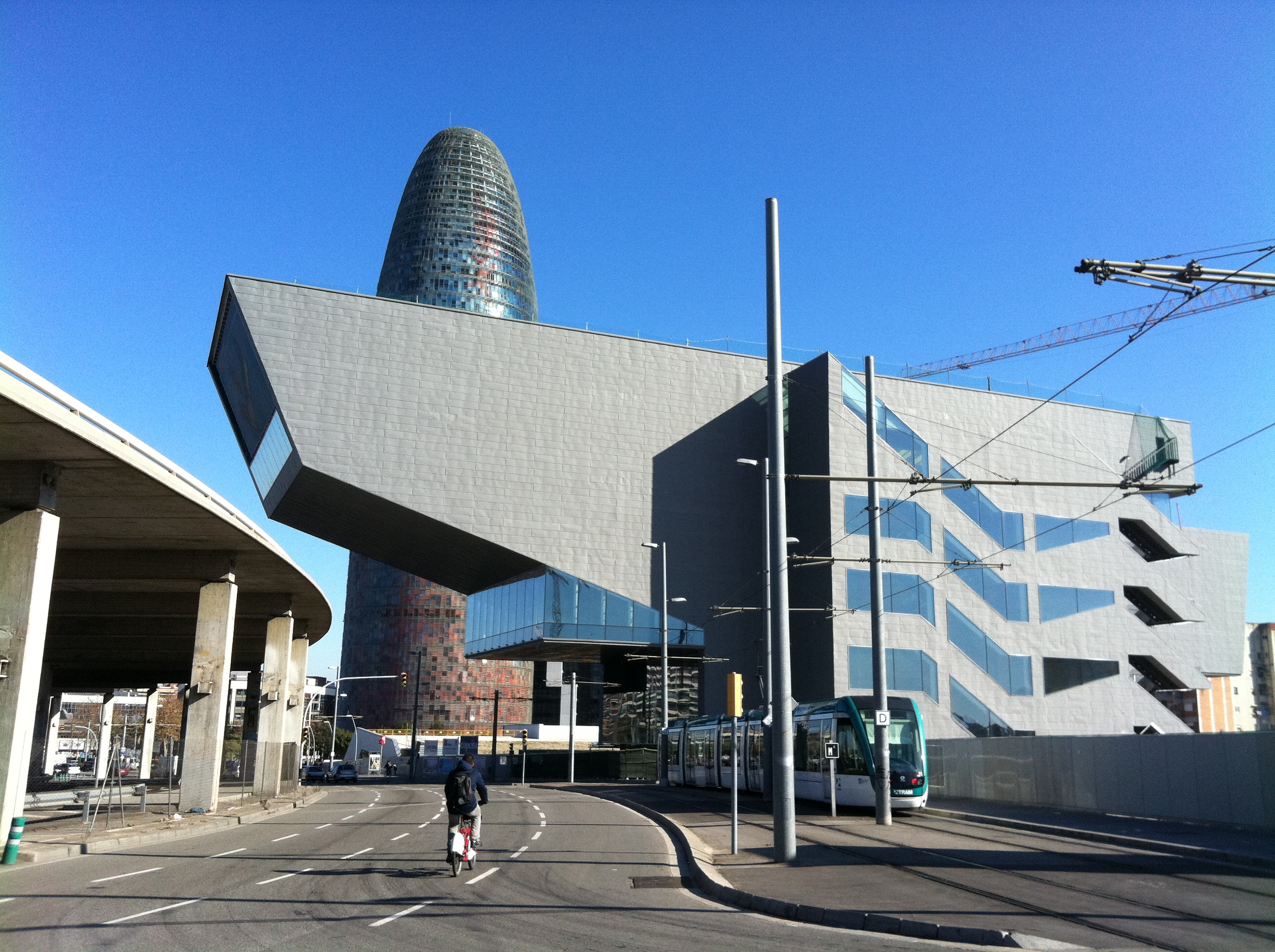
Disseny Hub Barcelona, their last project in Barcelona.

MBM partner David Mackay oversaw a masterplan for the "Arc of Opportunity" at the Lower Lea Valley, part of 2 billion pound regeneration scheme for London in 2002. In 2008 the firm's so-called Stapler museum design for Barcelona was initially rejected The museum is to hold a collection furniture, lamps and utensils in Barcelona and the contents of the city's former textile museum, "which was controversially closed" in 2006. but now under construction.

== Works ==
- Guardiola House, Argentona (1955)
- Europalma Apartments, Majorca (1964)
- Parc de la Creueta del Coll, Barcelona (1987)
- Quartier Sextius Mirabeau, Aix-en-Provence, France ( 1990) )
- Harbormaster's House, Olympic Port in Barcelona (1991)
- Vila Olimpica (Olympic Village), Barcelona (1992)
- Gothic stone and tensile pavilion, Seville Expo(1992)
- 'Small Circus' Apartments, Maastricht (1994-98)
- Disseny Hub Barcelona
