= Festival Grec de Barcelona =

International theatre, dance, music, and circus festival

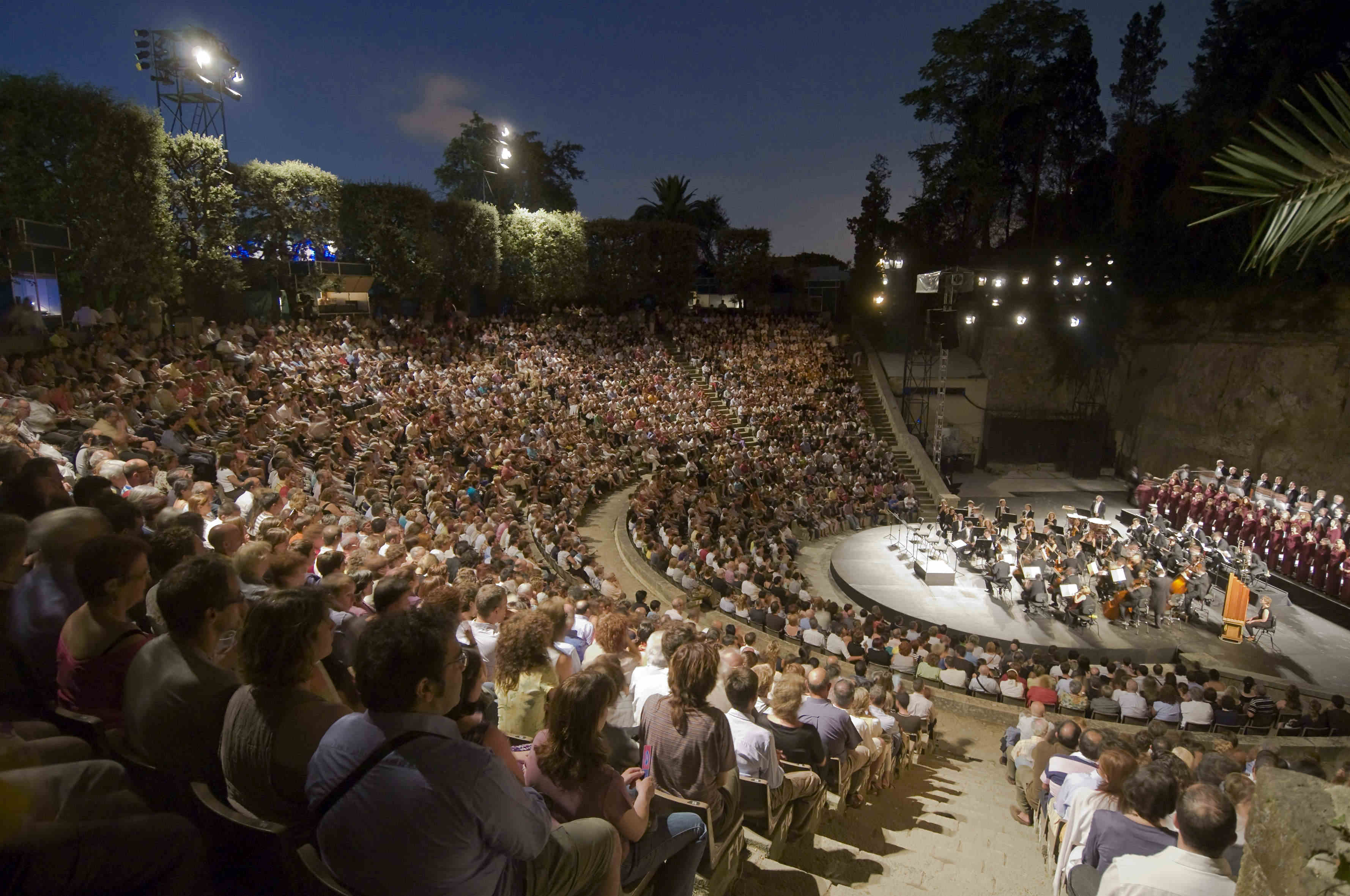
The Teatre Grec in 2011.

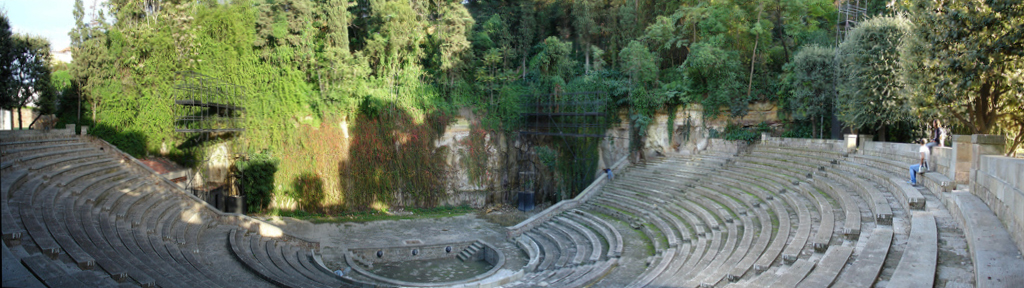
Panoramic view of Teatre Grec on Montjuïc hill

The Grec Festival of Barcelona (Catalan: Festival Grec de Barcelona) is an international festival of theatre, dance, music, and circus. With a long-standing tradition in the cultural life of the city, by the summer of 2017 it had reached its 41st edition. Throughout its history, the Grec Festival has not only become one of the main attractions of Barcelona's summer calendar but has also established itself as a prominent reference in the European performing arts scene.

The festival takes its name from its main venue: an open-air theatre (the Teatre Grec) built on Mount Montjuïc. The theatre was built in 1929 by the Catalan architect Ramon Reventós in the style of the ancient Greek theatres as part of the 1929 Barcelona International Exposition. By 1976, the theatre had fallen into a semi-abandoned state. The first Grec Festival both salvaged the theatre and achieved considerable public success. At first, the Grec was the only venue used for festival productions, but today, the festival utilizes several venues throughout the city of Barcelona.

The festival pursues a two-fold mission: to stage the most outstanding works by Catalan artists and companies and to present other interesting shows from Spain and the rest of the world.

Artists who have appeared at the Festival include Dario Fo, Lindsay Kemp, the Martha Graham Dance Company, Ballet BC, Sydney Dance Company, Jan Fabre, Peter Brook, Sasha Waltz, Michel Piccoli, Robert Lepage, the Cloud Gate Dance Theater of Taiwan, Paco de Lucía, Cristina Hoyos, Carles Santos, Nacho Duato, Àlex Rigola, Calixto Bieito, Miles Davis, Manhattan Transfer, Joe Cocker, Celia Cruz, Chuck Berry, and Elvis Costello.

== History ==
In the years leading up to the return of democracy in Spain, Barcelona's theatre scene saw the rise of an independent and avant-garde movement, breaking away from the conventional offerings of the time. In 1976, the Assemblea d'Actors i Directors (Assembly of Actors and Directors) organised a summer season of performances at the Teatre Grec, which had been largely abandoned until then.

That first Grec Festival was a self-managed, grassroots initiative and proved to be a public success. The Assembly ran the festival for two editions. In 1978, the festival was not held, but following the first democratic municipal elections in 1979, Barcelona City Council took over its organisation.

The festival gradually expanded, embracing international productions from 1980 onwards, which, along with support for local creation, became one of its defining features.

Over the years, the Grec Festival has extended its reach across various venues in Barcelona and has supported alternative theatre spaces and companies, while maintaining a balanced programme that appeals to a broad audience. The festival also works closely with the private sector.

In recent years, the festival has focused on emerging talent and experimental works, while also diversifying its offerings to include contemporary dance and circus alongside traditional theatre and music. Each edition often includes a thematic focus on a specific country.

== Artistic Directors ==
- 1976–1977: Assemblea d'Actors i Directors
- 1978: Festival not held
- 1979: Rafael Pradas & Joan-Anton Benach (Barcelona City Council)
- 1980–1983: Biel Moll
- 1984–1985: Joan Maria Gual & Josep Anton Codina
- 1986–1987: Marta Tatjer
- 1988–1995: Elena Posa
- 1996–1999: Xavier Albertí
- 2000–2006: Borja Sitjà
- 2007–2011: Ricardo Szwarcer
- 2012–2016: Ramon Simó i Vinyes
- 2017–2024: Francesc Casadesús i Calvó
- 2024–present: Leticia Martín Ruiz

== See also ==
- Culture of Barcelona
- List of contemporary amphitheaters
