= Josef Müller =

Josef Müller or Joseph Muller may refer to:

- Josef Müller (art collector) (1887–1977), Swiss art collector and curator
- Josef Müller (entomologist) (1880–1964), Croatian entomologist
- Josef Müller (footballer) (1893–1984), German footballer
- Josef Müller (politician) (1898–1979), German politician and member of the German Resistance
- Josef Müller-Brockmann (1914–1996), graphic designer
- Josef Felix Müller (born 1955), Swiss sculptor, graphic artist and painter
- Joseph Muller (collector) (1883–1939), specialist in American music
- Joseph Müller (priest) (1894–1944), German Catholic priest and critic of the Nazi regime
- Joseph Muller (cyclist) (1895–1975), French cyclist
- Joseph E. Muller (1908–1945), American soldier and Medal of Honor recipient
- Joseph Maximilian Mueller (1894–1981), American prelate of the Roman Catholic Church
