= Museo de Arte Precolombino =

Museo de Arte Precolombino (Spanish) or Pre-Columbian Art Museum (English) may refer to:

- Museo de Arte Precolombino (Peru), in Cusco, Peru
- Museo Chileno de Arte Precolombino, in Santiago, Chile
- Museu Barbier-Mueller d'Art Precolombí, in Barcelona, Spain
- Dumbarton Oaks Research Library and Collection, in Washington DC, containing the Pre-Columbian Art Museum

== See also ==
- Category:Pre-Columbian art museums, for museums exhibiting pre-Columbian art and artefacts, in general
