= Tourism in Spain =

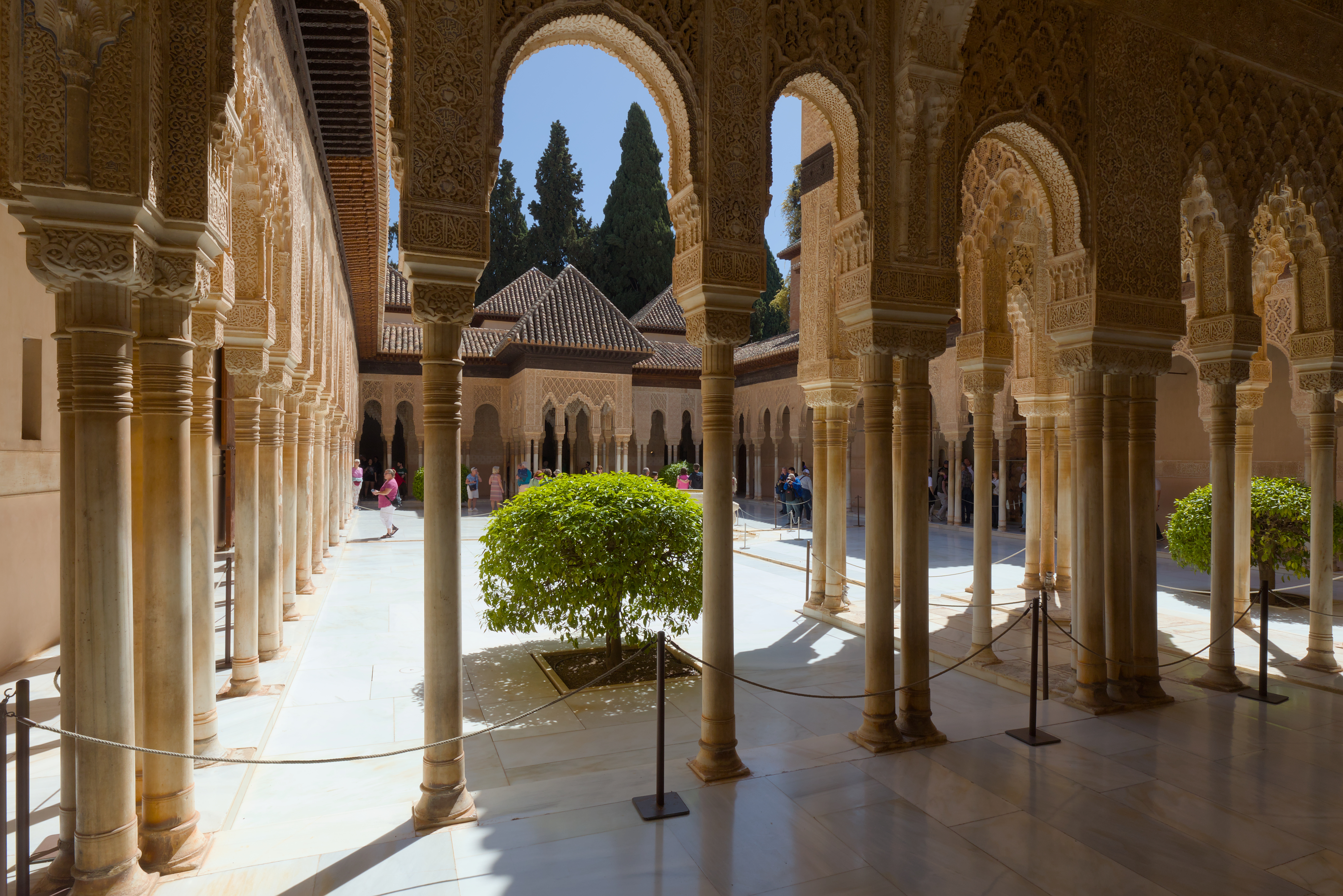
The Court of the Lions (Patio de los Leones) in the Alhambra complex, in Granada.

Tourism in Spain is a major component of the national economy. In 2024, domestic and international tourism combined accounted for 12.6% of Spain’s GDP (200,699 million euros). The characteristic tourism branches generated more than 2.7 million jobs, representing 12.3% of total employment. The international tourist expenditure in 2024 was around 126 billion euros. Since 1959, the tourism industry has become one of the key sectors of the Spanish economy. The country has been a popular destination for summer holidays, especially with large numbers of tourists from the United Kingdom, Ireland, France, Germany, Italy, the Benelux, and the United States, among others. Accordingly, Spain's foreign tourist industry has grown into the second-biggest in the world.

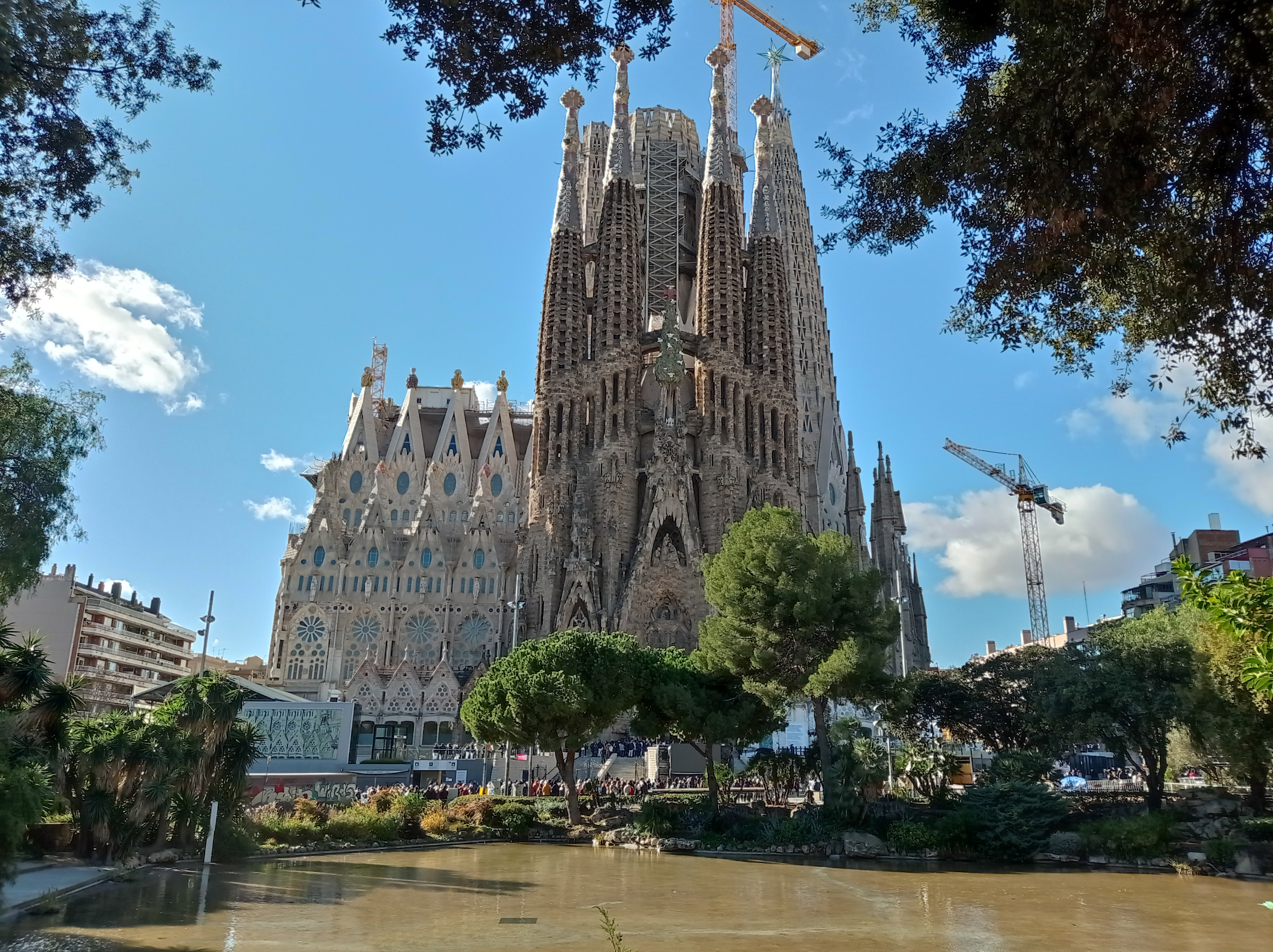
The Sagrada Família, located in Barcelona

In 2025, Spain was the second most visited country in the world, recording around 97 million international tourists, which marked the eighth consecutive year of record-breaking numbers.

Due to the coronavirus pandemic in 2020, only 18.9 million tourists visited Spain. These dramatic figures were devastating for the tourism sector and were a reflection of what would become the worst year for this industry, in terms of income, ever recorded. However, by 2022 the industry had mostly recovered, with 71,659,281 international tourists and increasing.

Spain ranks first among 140 countries in the biannual Travel and Tourism Competitiveness Index published by the World Economic Forum in 2019, matching the top position already achieved in 2017 and 2015. The World Tourism Organization has its headquarters in Madrid.

== Statistics ==
=== Arrivals ===
Yearly tourist arrivals in millions

Most visitors arriving to Spain on a short-term basis were from the following countries:

Rank	Country	2025	2024	2023	2022	2021	2020	2019	2018	2017	2016
1	United Kingdom	19,084,423	18,403,216	17,262,287	15,121,910	4,302,634	3,150,204	18,012,484	18,502,722	18,806,776	17,675,367
2	France	12,767,491	12,980,341	11,768,264	10,096,040	5,822,671	3,887,750	11,147,397	11,343,649	11,267,269	11,258,540
3	Germany	12,050,833	11,937,236	10,989,659	9,768,600	5,208,894	2,391,437	11,158,022	11,414,481	11,897,376	11,414,481
4	Italy	5,704,989	5,437,840	4,849,748	4,011,139	1,703,423	947,406	4,534,515	4,382,503	4,222,865	3,969,322
5	Netherlands	5,007,641	4,780,863	4,320,630	3,923,089	2,048,853	918,361	3,684,260	3,848,545	3,704,549	3,355,031
6	United States	4,456,665	4,263,842	3,835,884	2,801,476	797,844	405,810	3,324,870	2,949,710	2,637,484	2,001,813
7	Portugal	3,383,482	2,986,601	2,802,774	2,415,936	1,193,649	762,384	2,428,790	2,346,405	2,137,880	1,996,164
8	Belgium	3,082,338	3,063,431	2,758,684	2,513,389	1,464,091	743,411	2,525,887	2,500,278	2,474,720	2,301,628
9	Ireland	3,051,008	2,773,264	2,476,105	2,089,464	631,314	329,043	2,177,592	2,049,272	2,046,123	1,808,469
10	Switzerland	2,253,750	2,117,258	2,002,197	1,654,733	945,710	397,074	1,811,865	1,884,783	2,059,201	1,703,481
11	Mexico	1,022,124	1,080,318	984,259	725,093	249,732	129,785	597,777	499,803	450,822	370,044
12	Argentina	817,880	668,874	572,276	495,351	64,287	162,311	721,697	714,774	746,498	562,680
13	China	790,954	647,801	388,515	56,646	29,131	134,612	700,748	649,032	514,777	374,755
14	Brazil	703,415	598,456	565,823	347,798	139,937	167,215	564,854	558,674	467,508	372,759
15	Turkey	645,649	604,676	340,906	280,151	139,427	139,427	269,557	292,949	290,280	297,625
16	Canada	628,214	643,689	653,628	380,100	139,449	115,130	450,663	446,719	488,217	390,765
17	Japan	445,470	410,292	310,532	310,532	29,368	112,916	677,659	550,681	444,518	463,420
18	South Korea	430,101	388,399	434,583	180,290	37,692	121,931	630,797	490,631	446,069	312,432
19	Chile	311,726	348,746	300,372	185,216	59,313	63,011	213,656	213,656	140,336	91,177
20	Israel	276,932	296,601	396,941	302,520	79,908	54,500	341,773	317,696	269,264	312,573
	North Europe	5,123,954	5,147,430	4,795,675	4,291,225	1,839,655	1,175,330	5,530,112	5,783,558	5,826,548	5,129,025
	Other Europe	9,711,784	9,112,689	7,895,219	6,545,774	2,991,449	1,692,075	6,441,423	5,980,237	5,543,011	5,026,962
	Total international visitors	96,803,894	93,799,505	85,169,050	71,659,281	31,180,802	18,933,103	83,509,153	82,773,156	81,868,522	75,315,008

=== Autonomous Community by nights spent in hotel ===
#	Autonomous Community	Non-residents	Residents	Total
1	Canary Islands	84,000,000	10,000,000	94,000,000
2	Catalonia	62,000,000	22,000,000	84,000,000
3	Andalusia	32,000,000	34,000,000	66,000,000
4	Balearic Islands	54,000,000	9,000,000	63,000,000
5	Valencian Community	29,000,000	27,000,000	56,000,000
6	Community of Madrid	26,000,000	16,000,000	42,000,000
7	Galicia	6,000,000	15,000,000	21,000,000
8	Castile and León	5,000,000	14,000,000	19,000,000
9	Basque Country	10,000,000	8,000,000	18,000,000
10	Aragon	4,000,000	10,000,000	14,000,000
11	Asturias	3,000,000	9,000,000	12,000,000
12	Region of Murcia	5,000,000	7,000,000	12,000,000
13	Cantabria	2,000,000	8,000,000	10,000,000
14	Navarre	3,000,000	5,000,000	8,000,000
15	Extremadura	2,000,000	6,000,000	8,000,000
16	Castile-La Mancha	2,000,000	5,000,000	7,000,000
17	La Rioja	2,000,000	3,000,000	5,000,000
18	Ceuta	40,000	100,000	140,000
19	Melilla	20,700	108,000	128,700
-	Total	331,000,000	208,000,000	539,000,000

=== Most visited cities ===
In 2024, the most visited cities were:

#	City	Autonomous Community	Arrivals
1	Madrid	Community of Madrid	10,423,522
2	Barcelona	Catalonia	8,979,957
3	Seville	Andalusia	3,131,100
4	Palma de Mallorca	Balearic Islands	2,630,376
5	Benidorm	Valencian Community	2,442,054
6	Valencia	Valencian Community	2,132,427
7	Granada	Andalusia	1,871,934
8	Málaga	Andalusia	1,834,638
9	San Bartolomé de Tirajana	Canary Islands	1,821,323
10	Calvià	Balearic Islands	1,790,062
11	Adeje	Canary Islands	1,566,112
12	Salou	Catalonia	1,316,948
13	Zaragoza	Aragon	1,212,333
14	Bilbao	Basque Country	1,200,763
15	Lloret de Mar	Catalonia	1,170,583
16	Torremolinos	Andalusia	1,097,475
17	San Sebastián	Basque Country	1,049,514
18	Córdoba	Andalusia	1,001,282
19	Pájara	Canary Islands	979,208
20	Arona	Canary Islands	925,833
21	Santiago de Compostela	Galicia	918,889
22	Alicante	Valencian Community	910,669
23	Puerto de la Cruz	Canary Islands	758,521
24	Salamanca	Castile and León	735,546
25	Yaiza	Canary Islands	731,555
26	Benalmádena	Andalusia	712,961
27	Marbella	Andalusia	711,877
28	Mogán	Canary Islands	698,894
29	Toledo	Castile-La Mancha	625,638
30	Alcúdia	Balearic Islands	625,272
31	Sant Llorenç des Cardassar	Balearic Islands	610,727
32	Roquetas de Mar	Andalusia	589,100
33	Murcia	Region of Murcia	581,956
34	Fuengirola	Andalusia	571,296
35	Sant Josep de sa Talaia	Balearic Islands	559,292
36	A Coruña	Galicia	547,356
37	Burgos	Castile and León	532,888
38	Vigo	Galicia	529,375
39	Santander	Cantabria	507,540
40	Las Palmas de Gran Canaria	Canary Islands	484,482
41	Oviedo	Asturias	484,431
42	Tías	Canary Islands	483,332
43	L'Hospitalet de Llobregat	Catalonia	467,765
44	Ibiza	Balearic Islands	463,776
45	Muro	Balearic Islands	455,754
46	La Oliva	Canary Islands	433,286
47	Capdepera	Balearic Islands	430,423
48	Chiclana de la Frontera	Andalusia	427,763
49	Gijón	Asturias	418,011
50	León	Castile and León	415,697

== Transport ==
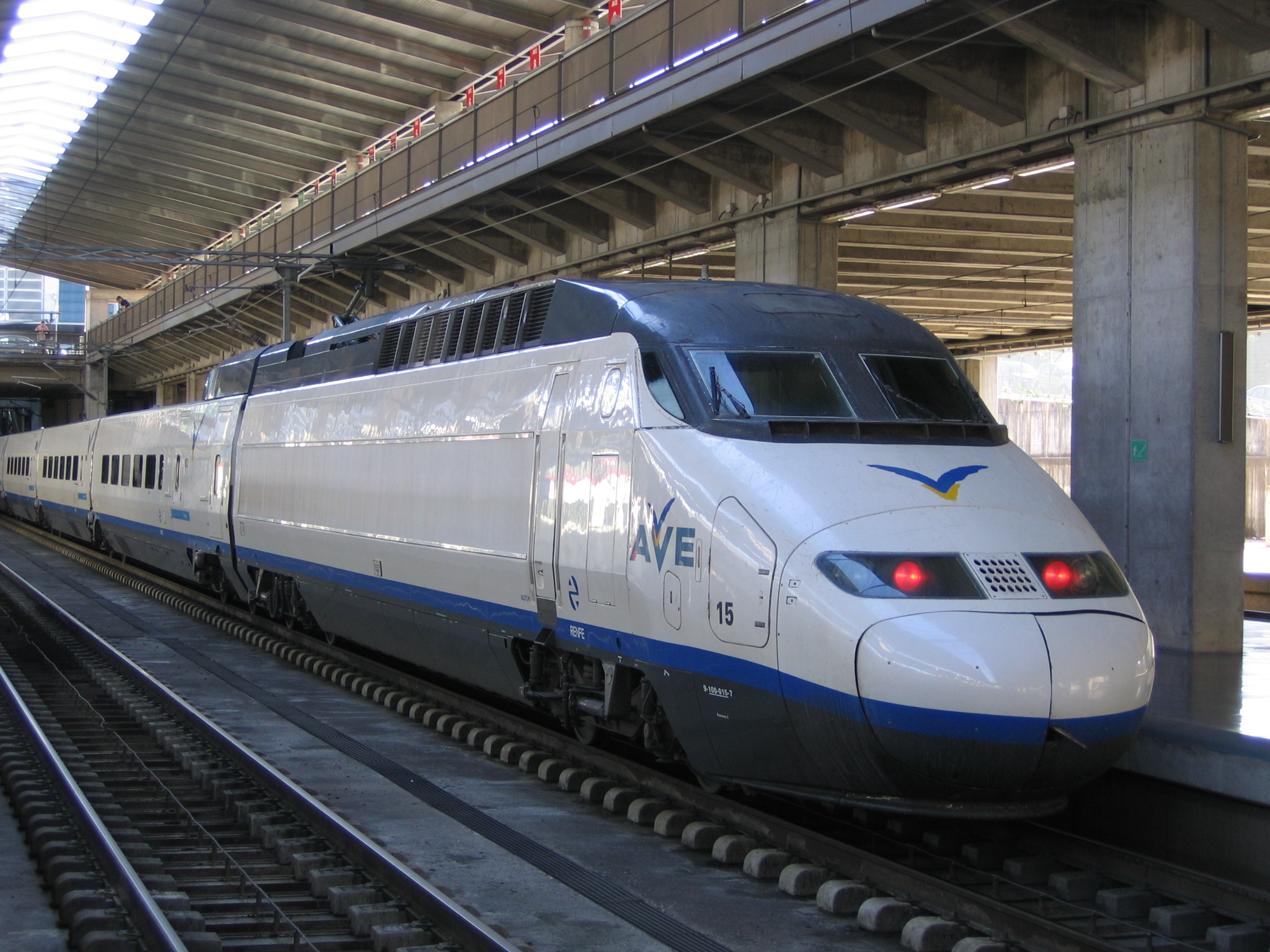
AVE train in Córdoba.

Spain's national airline is Iberia, but the country can be flown into on many international passenger airlines and charter airlines.

Tourists also arrive in Spain by road, rail and over the water. Spanish freeways interconnecting the touristic cities are also linked with the French freeway network across the Pyrenees. The main train operator is Renfe, including AVE (Spanish high speed train) or Talgo intercity services. Spain's high-speed rail link is the largest in Europe and second largest in the world after China. There is also a number of high-end tourism oriented hotel-train services, such as Transcantábrico.

== Summer resorts and beaches ==
Summer resorts and beaches

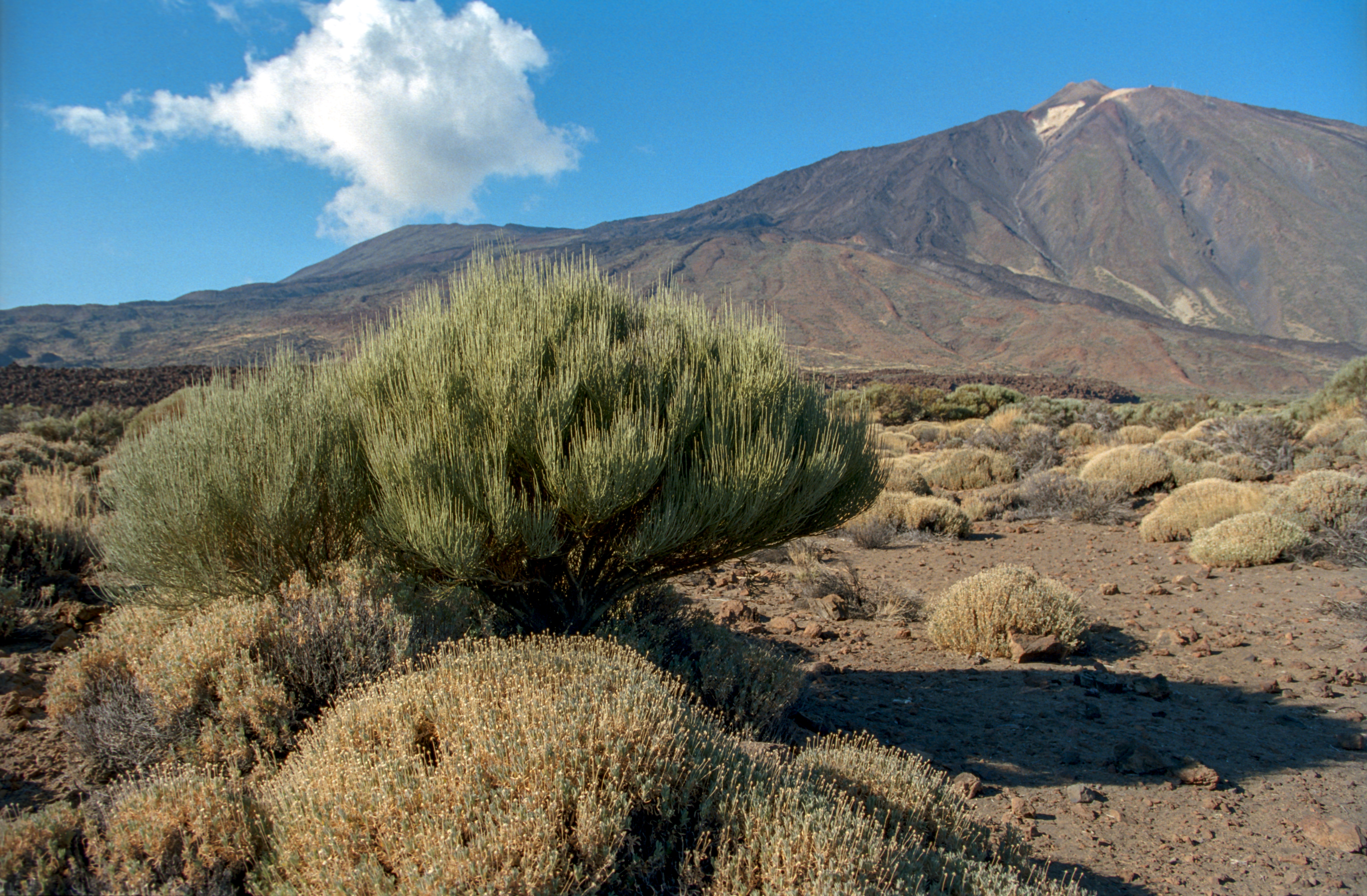
The Teide National Park, on the island of Tenerife is the most visited national park in Spain.

This type of tourism was the first to be developed in Spain, and today, generates the most income for the Spanish economy. The mild climate during the whole year and the extensive sandy beaches of the Mediterranean and Atlantic Ocean as well as of its two archipelagoes (the Balearic Islands and the Canary Islands respectively) have been attracting tourists from Northern Europe for decades. The leading source markets of Spanish beach tourism are the UK (around 24% of the total arrivals in Spain in recent years), Germany and France (around 15-16% each), followed by Scandinavia and Italy (around 7% each) and the Netherlands (around 5%).

The most popular Spanish mainland coasts are on its Mediterranean side, and include, from north to south clockwise:

- The Costa Brava, the Costa Daurada and the Costa del Maresme, in the Autonomous Community of Catalonia, very popular with visitors from France as well as inland Spain, with notable resorts like Salou and the city of Barcelona.
- The Costa Blanca, (one of the most developed coastal areas of Spain, extremely popular for tourists from the United Kingdom and Germany, with Benidorm as the leading summer city of Spain) and the Costa del Azahar are both in the Valencian Community.
- The Costa Cálida in the Region of Murcia and the Mar Menor, a lagoon by the Mediterranean sea.
- The Costa de Almería, the Costa Tropical, the Costa del Sol and the Costa de la Luz, all in the community of Andalusia. Some of the summer destinations here are renowned worldwide, such as Marbella in Málaga Province or Sotogrande in Cádiz province, both destinations for tourists and summer residents with big purchasing power. The city of Málaga is a notable Costa del Sol destination and also one of the largest harbours in Spain and frequented by cruise ships.

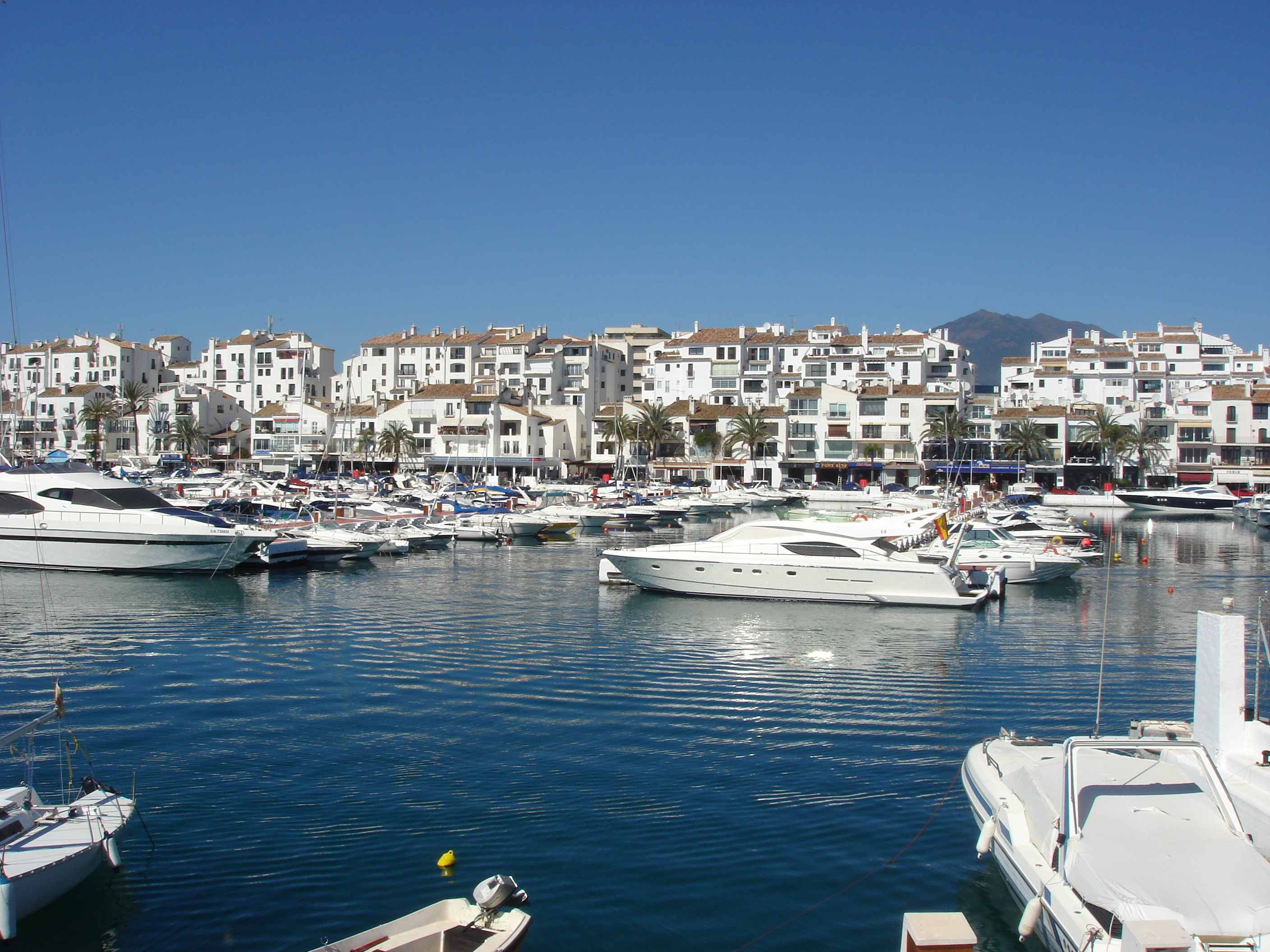
Puerto Banús, Marbella, Málaga, Costa del Sol.

Spain's two archipelagoes, the Balearic Islands off the mainland coast in the Mediterranean and the volcanic Canary Islands in the Atlantic, are also both very popular destinations with Spaniards and Europeans.

Regions	2016 (Jan to Aug) millions of visitors
Catalonia inc. Costa Brava, Costa Daurada	12.58
Balearic Islands inc. Mallorca, Menorca, Ibiza	9.65
Canary Islands inc. Tenerife, Lanzarote	8.62
Andalusia inc. Costa Almeria, Costa del Sol, Marbella, Málaga	7.39
Valencia inc. Costa Blanca	5.56

In addition to the summer tourism, other modalities like cultural and monumental tourism congresses, sport or fun tourism have been developed in these areas, including such famous cities as Barcelona and Valencia, the biggest harbours of the Spanish Mediterranean coast.

Many coastal or island places also have great ecological and natural importance. Theme Parks like Terra Mítica, Tibidabo Amusement Park, Tivoli World and the resort PortAventura World or diverse water-fun parks are also popular.

In 2014 Spain broke its own record of blue flag beaches, achieving 681 flags and becoming the leader in the Northern Hemisphere. Spain is also the leader in blue flags for marinas.

== Cultural tourism, business tourism ==
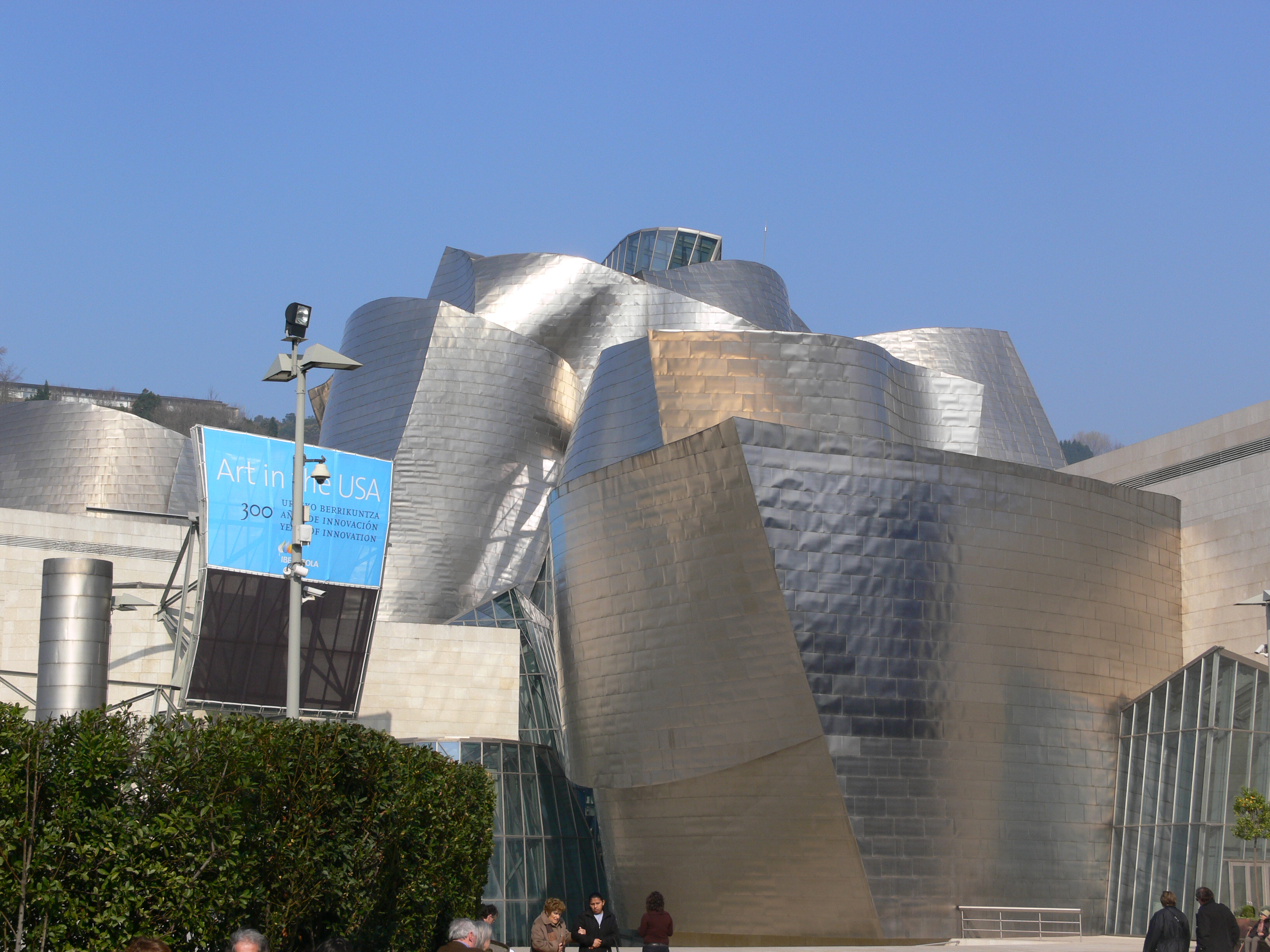
Guggenheim Museum Bilbao.

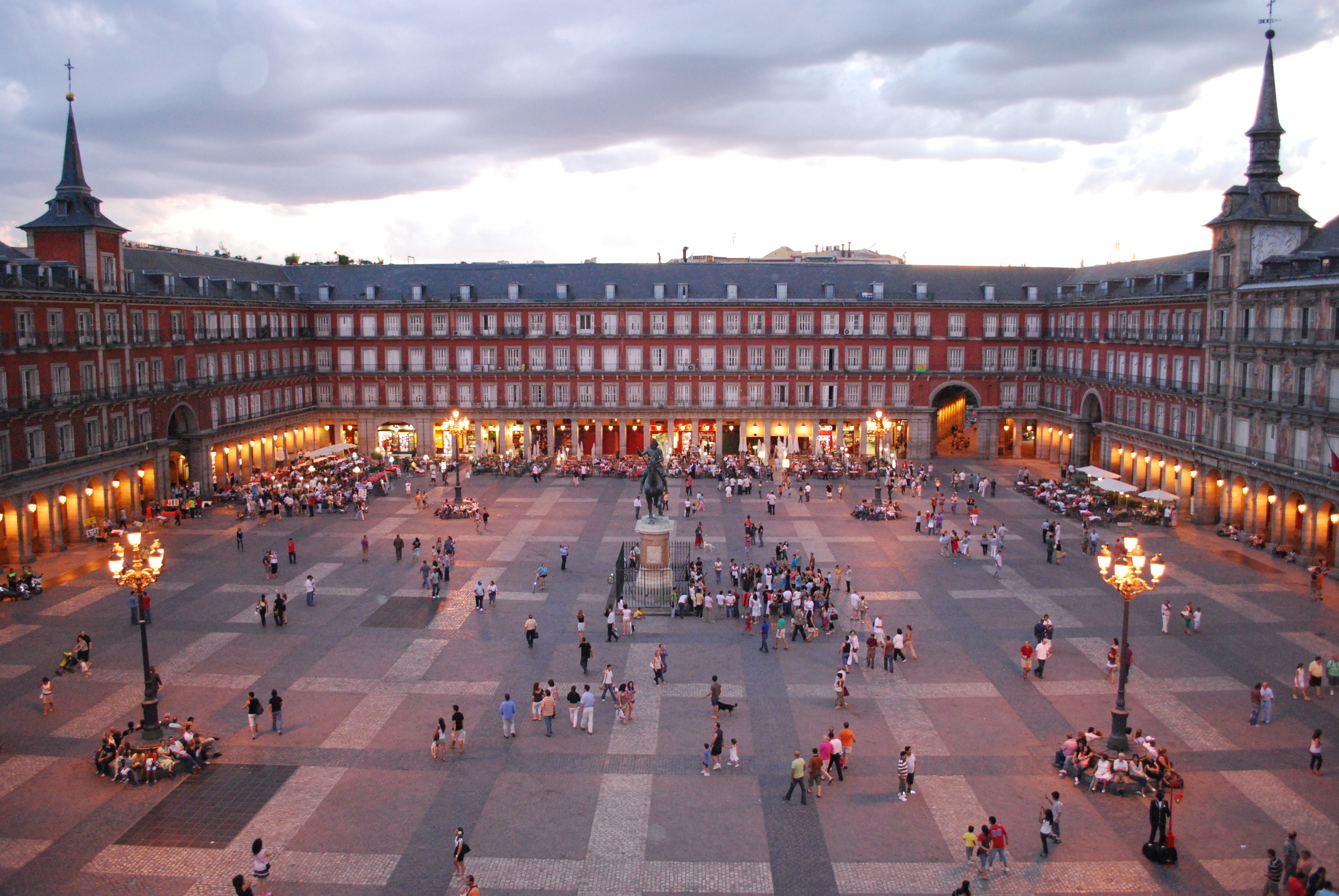
Plaza Mayor in Madrid

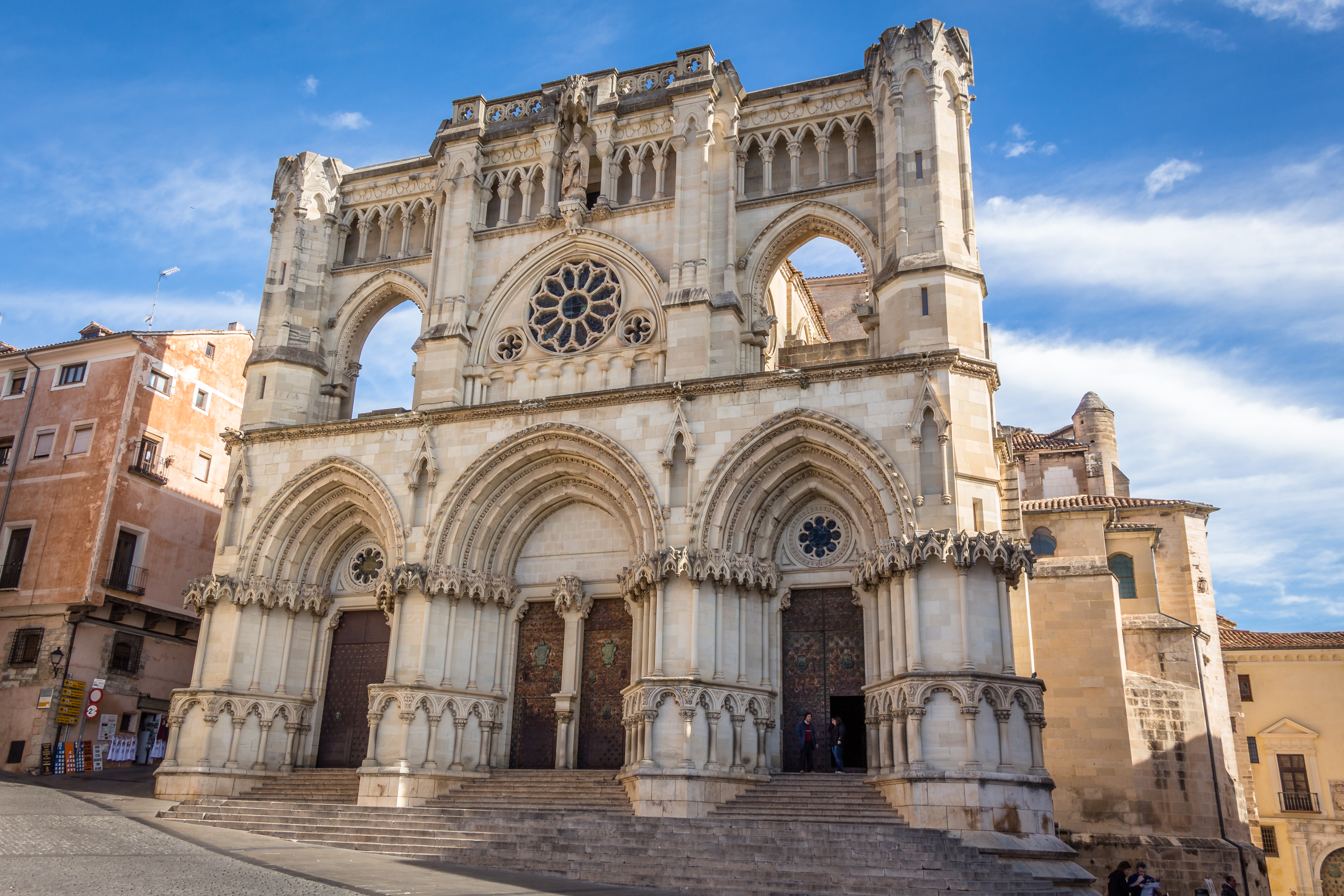
The 12th century Cathedral in Cuenca

As a crossroads of several civilisations, Spain offers a number of historical cities and towns. Major destinations include Spain's two largest cities: Madrid and Barcelona, which stand as two of the leading city destinations in Europe. Both offer a matchless number of attractions and their importance in commerce, education, entertainment, media, fashion, science, sports and arts contribute to their status as two of the world's major global cities. Fifteen Spanish cities have been declared World Heritage Cities by the UNESCO: Alcalá de Henares, Ávila, Baeza, Cáceres, Córdoba, Cuenca, Ibiza, Mérida, Salamanca, San Cristóbal de La Laguna, Santiago de Compostela, Segovia, Tarragona, Toledo and Úbeda . As of October 2016, Spain has 45 total sites inscribed on the list, third only to Italy (51) and China (50). Of these 45 sites, 40 are cultural, 3 are natural, and 2 are mixed (meeting both cultural and natural criteria), as determined by the organization's selection criteria. Other first-class destinations are Seville, Granada, Santander, Oviedo, Gijón, Bilbao and San Sebastián. All of them with historical landmarks and a lively cultural agenda.

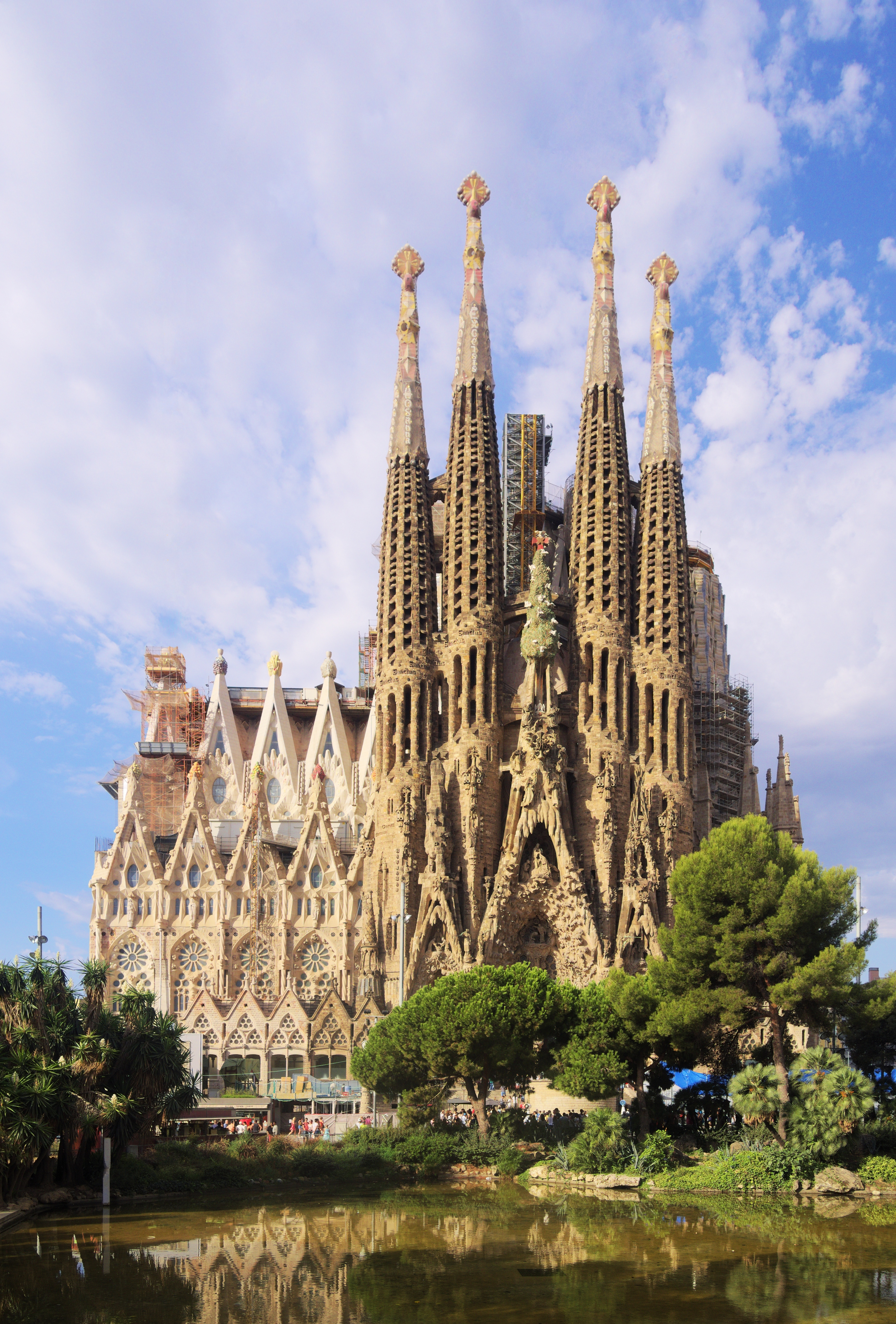
Sagrada Família in Barcelona.

=== Student programs ===
Besides hosting some of the most renowned business schools in the world such as IE Business School, ESADE or IESE Business School, Spain is a popular destination for students from abroad. In particular, during the 2010–11 academic year Spain was the European country receiving the most Erasmus Programme students.

=== Religion ===
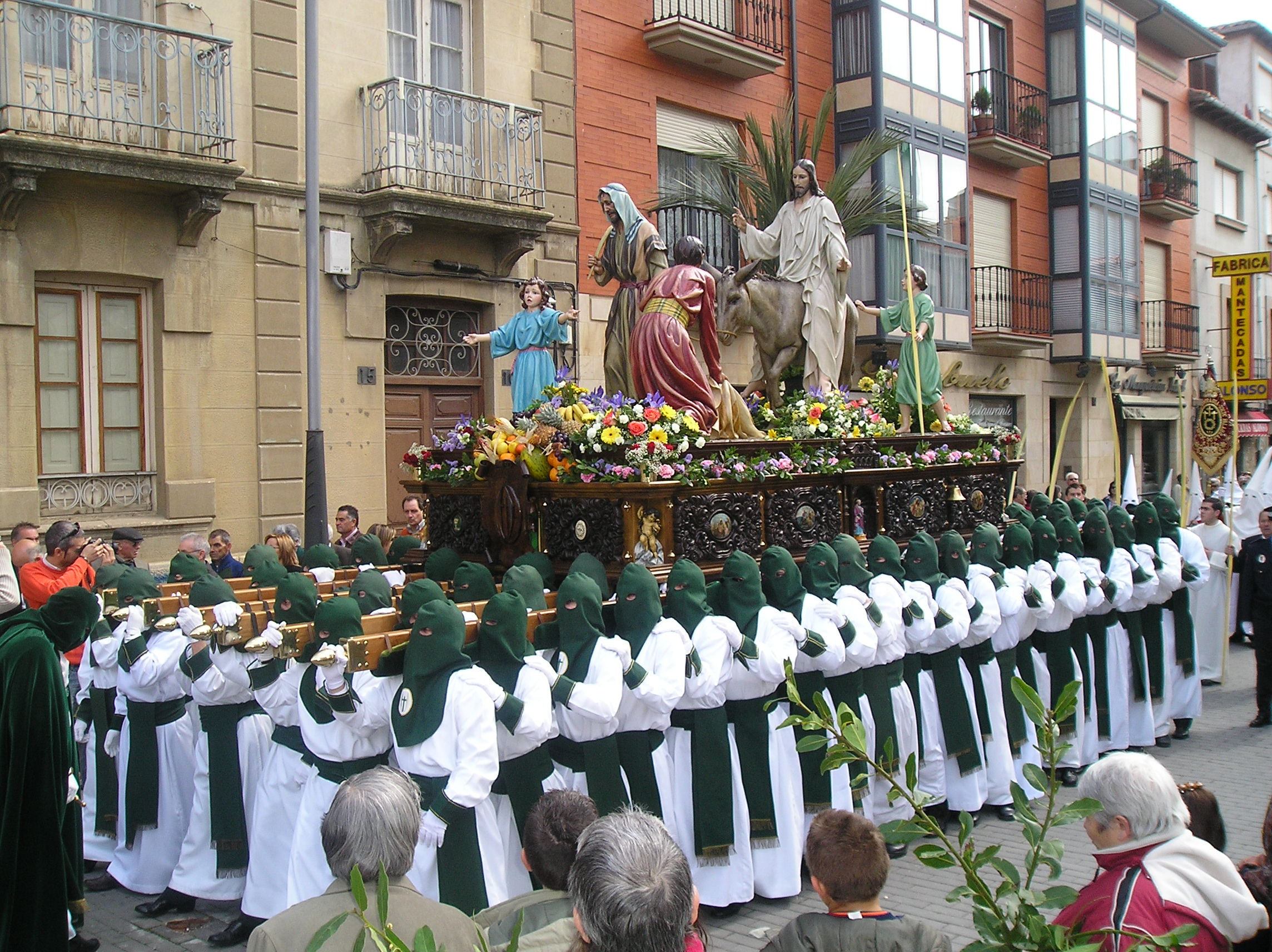
Holy Week in Astorga

Spain is an important place for Catholicism. In fact, some of the holiest places for the Catholic Church are in Spain: city of Santiago de Compostela in Galicia (North-West Spain), the third holiest place after the Vatican City in Rome and Jerusalem. It is also the terminus of the Way of Saint James. Santo Toribio de Liébana, Cantabria (also in North Spain) is the fourth, followed by Caravaca de la Cruz at the South-East, (fifth holiest place). These places attract pilgrims and tourists from all over the world. Religion also has found its artistic expression through the popular Holy Week processions, which become important in almost every town, Seville arguably holds some of the most elaborate processions for Holy Week.

=== Festivals ===
Most festivals turn around patron saints, legends, local customs and folklore. Among the most singular ones stand out the Seville Fair (Feria de Abril in Spanish), the Romería de El Rocío in Almonte, Huelva, the world-famous Festival of San Fermin in Pamplona, the Falles in Valencia, the Tomatina in Buñol, Valencia and the Fiestas del Pilar in Zaragoza.

The Carnival is also popular all over Spain, but especially in the Canary Islands (Carnival of Santa Cruz de Tenerife) and Cádiz. There are renowned movie festivals all over the country, the most recognizable being the famous San Sebastián International Film Festival, the Málaga Film Festival, the Seminci (Valladolid International Film Festival), the Mostra de Valencia and the Sitges Film Festival, the world's foremost international festival specializing in fantasy and horror movies. Music festivals includes the Sónar, the FIB, the Festimad, the Primavera Sound, the Bilbao BBK Live, the Monegros Desert Festival and the SOS 4.8 Festival.

Several cities have hosted international events: the 1888 Barcelona Universal Exposition, the 1929 Barcelona International Exposition, the 1992 Summer Olympics, all in Barcelona, the Universal fair of 1992 in Seville, the 2007 America's Cup in Valencia, and the Expo 2008 in Zaragoza. In addition, some Spanish cities have been or will be European Capital of Culture: Madrid in 1992; Santiago de Compostela in 2000, Salamanca in 2002, and San Sebastián in 2016.

== Nightlife ==
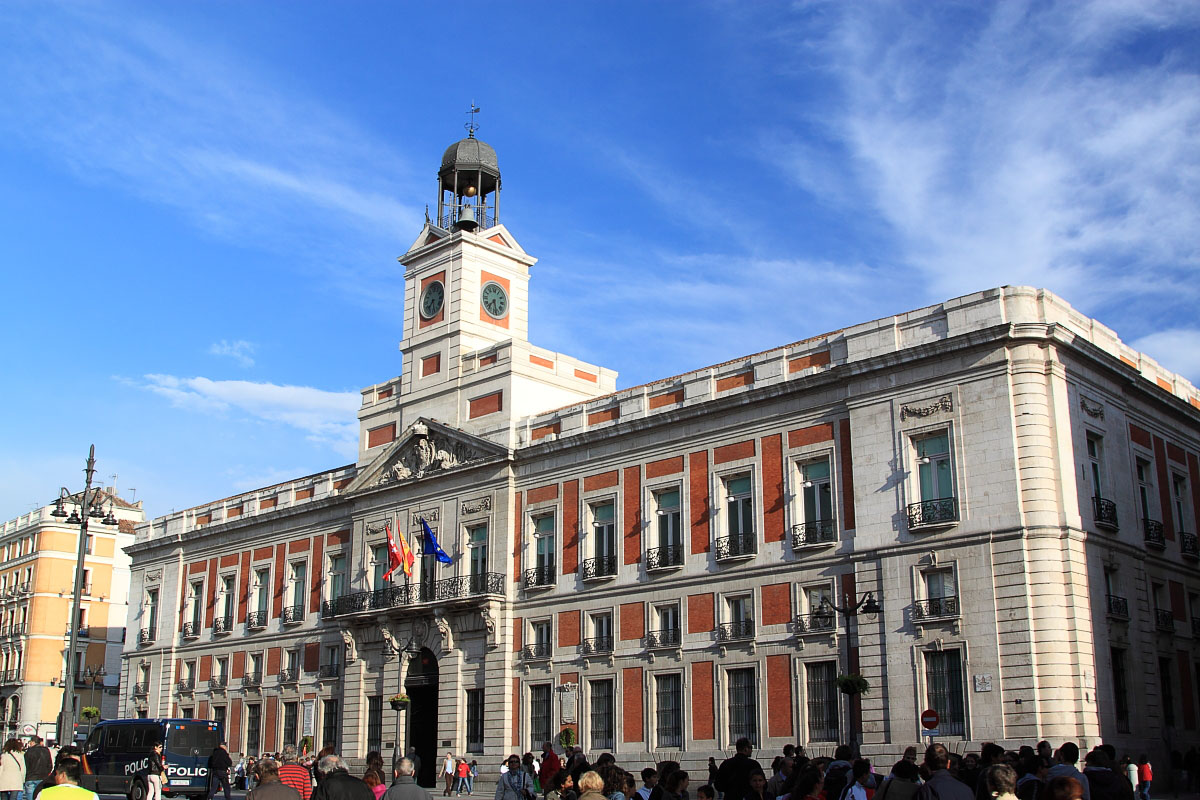
Puerta del Sol in Madrid is a very popular place for nightlife.

The nightlife in Spain is attractive to both tourists and locals, known to have some of the best in the world. Big cities such as Madrid and Barcelona are favorites amongst the large and popular discothèques. For instance, Madrid is known as the number one party city for clubs such as Pacha and Kapital (seven floors), and Barcelona is famous for Opium and Sutton famous clubs. The discothèques in Spain are open until hours such as 7am. The Baleraric Islands, such as Ibiza and Mallorca, are known to be major party destinations, as well as favored summer resort and in Andalusia, Málaga, specially the area of the Costa del Sol. Madrid is reputed to have a "vibrant nightlife".

Ibiza is a relatively small island and its cities have become world-famous for their associations with tourism, nightlife, and the electronic music the island has originated. Ibiza has garnered the reputation as the "Party Capital of the world". It is well known for its summer club scene which attracts very large numbers of tourists, but the island's government and the Spanish Tourist Office have controversially been working to promote more family-oriented tourism. Noted clubs include Space, Privilege, Amnesia, Ushuaïa, Pacha, DC10, Eden, and Es Paradis. Ibiza is also home to the legendary "port" in Ibiza Town, a popular stop for many tourists and now a UNESCO World Heritage Site.

Mallorca is an island located in the Mediterranean Sea. It is the largest island in the Balearic Islands archipelago in Spain.

The capital of the island, Palma, is also the capital of the autonomous community of the Balearic Islands. The Cabrera Archipelago is administratively grouped with Mallorca (in the municipality of Palma). The anthem of Mallorca is La Balanguera.

Like the other Balearic Islands of Menorca, Ibiza, and Formentera, the island is an extremely popular holiday destination, particularly for tourists from Germany, Ireland, Poland, the Scandinavian countries, and the United Kingdom. The name derives from Latin insula maior, "larger island"; later Maiorica, "the larger one" in comparison to Menorca, "the smaller one".

== Winter tourism ==
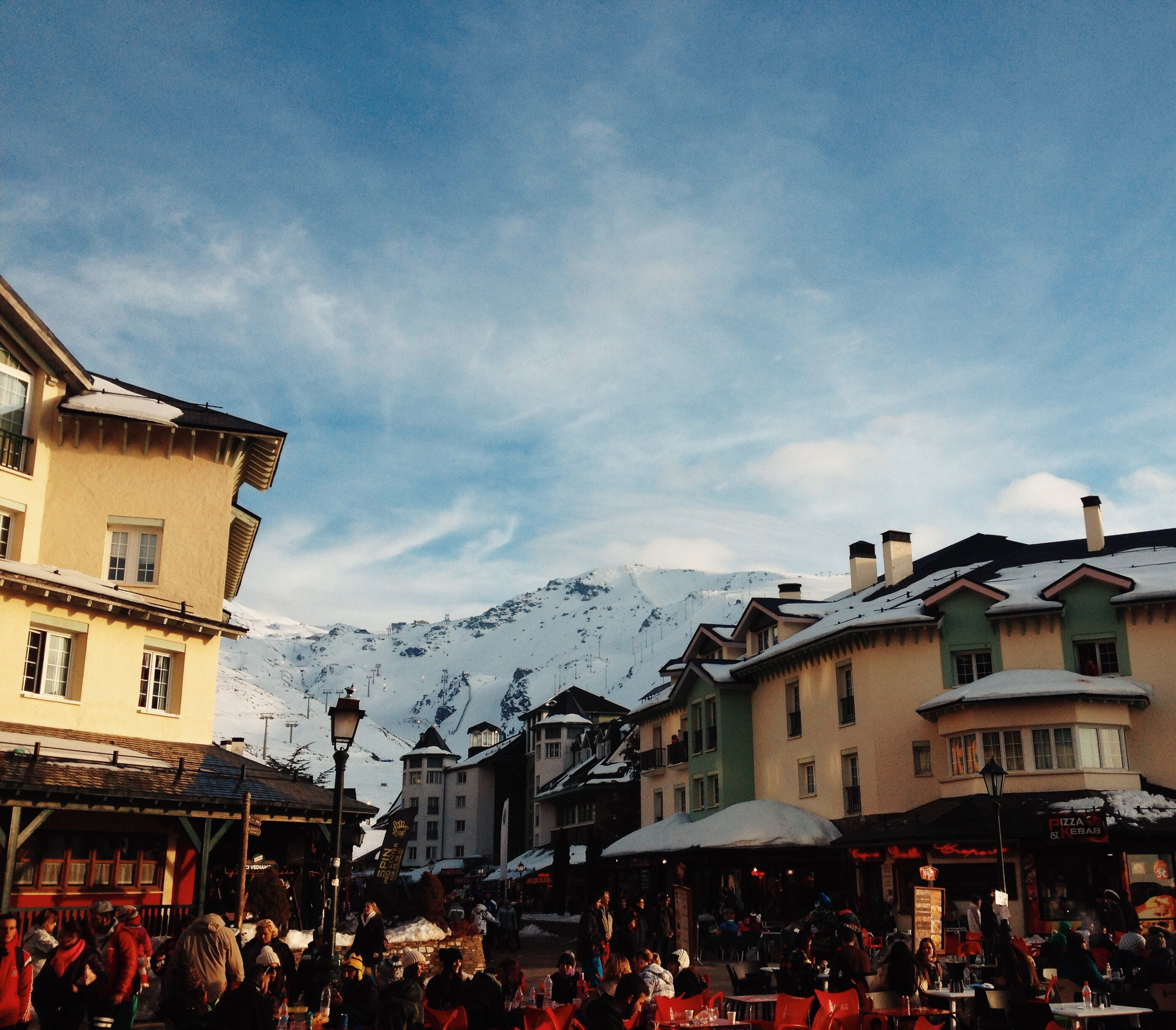
Sierra Nevada Ski Station

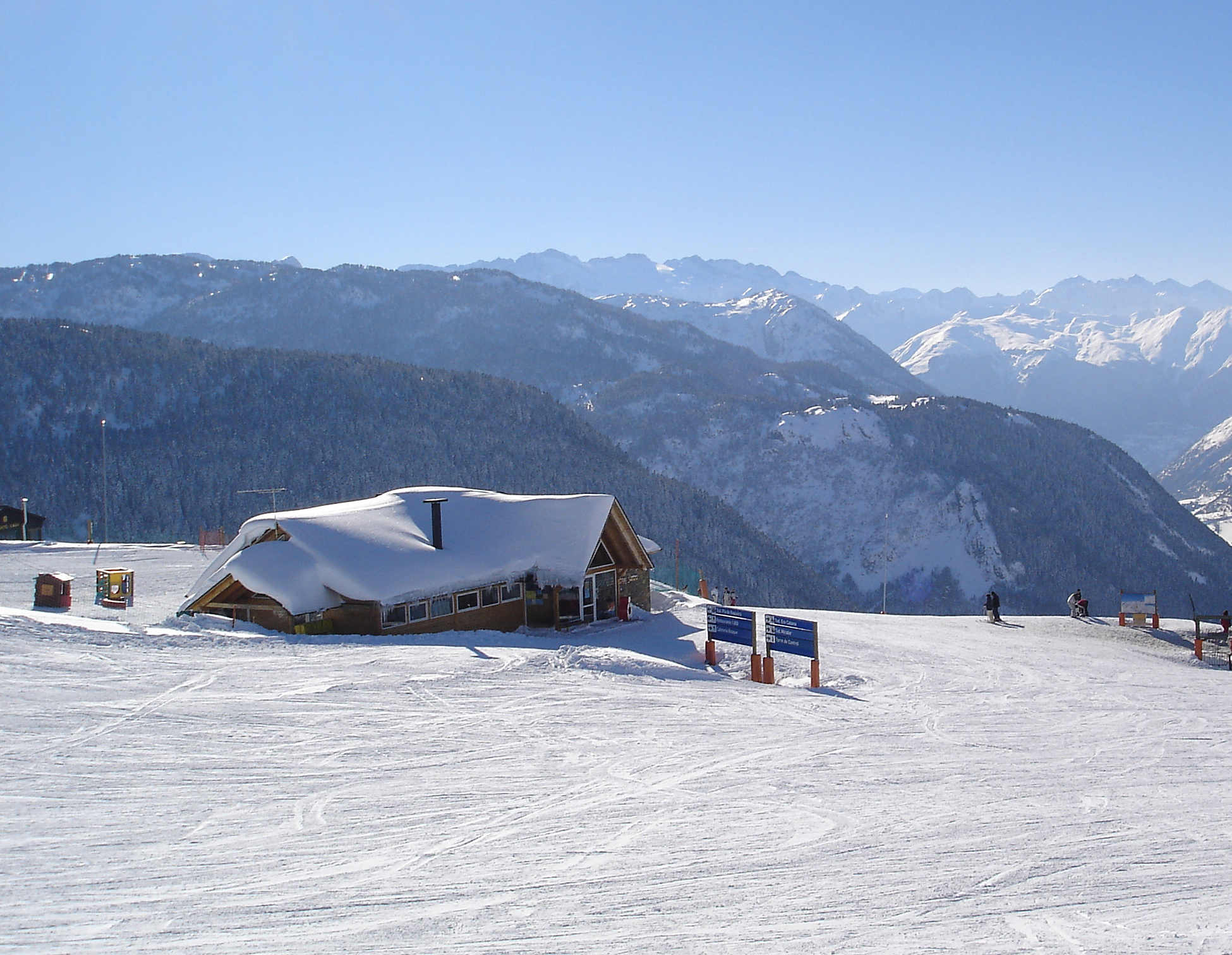
Baqueira-Beret ski resort.

Spain is a generally mountainous country, with well-known ski resorts located in several parts of the country, including the Pyrenees, the Sistema Central, the Sistema Ibérico and Sierra Nevada. For the most part, the main crest forms a massive divider between France and Spain, with the tiny country of Andorra sandwiched in between. The Crown of Aragon and the Kingdom of Navarre have historically extended on both sides of the mountain range, with small northern portions now in France and much larger southern parts now in Spain.

Sierra Nevada in Spain is a popular tourist destination, as its high peaks make skiing possible in one of Europe's most southerly ski resorts, in an area along the Mediterranean Sea predominantly known for its warm temperatures and abundant sunshine. At its foothills is found the city of Granada and, a little further, Almería and Málaga.

Parts of the range have been included in the Sierra Nevada National Park. The range has also been declared a biosphere reserve. The Sierra Nevada Observatory is located on the northern slopes at an elevation of 2,896 metres (9,501 ft). The Sierra Nevada was formed during the Alpine Orogeny, a mountain-building event that also formed the European Alps to the east and the Atlas Mountains of northern Africa across the Mediterranean Sea to the south. The Sierra as observed today formed during the Paleogene and Neogene Periods (66 to 1.8 million years ago) from the collision of the African and Eurasian continental plates.

== Nature and rural tourism ==
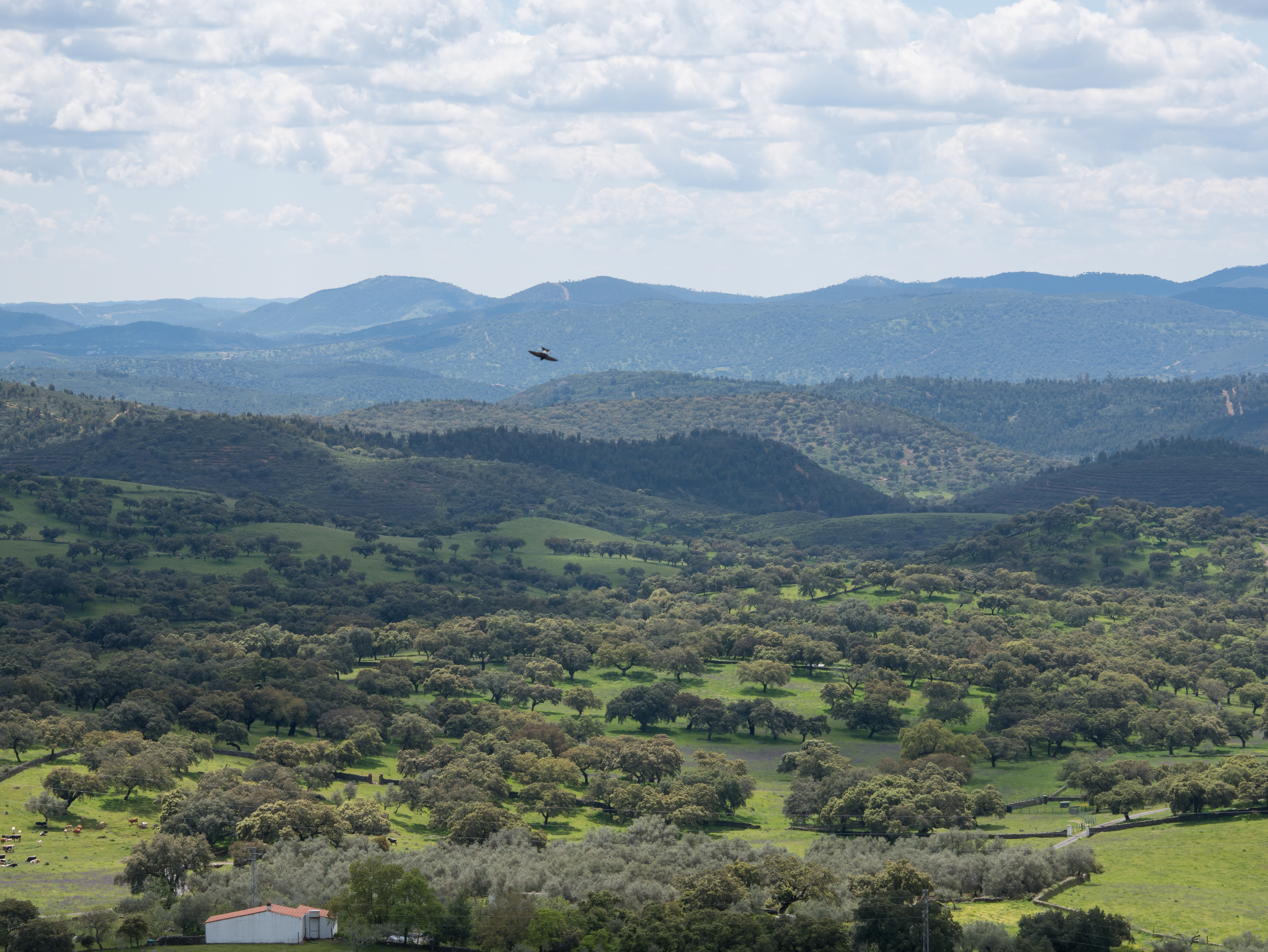
The dehesa landscape typical to some inland parts of Spain

Spain is the second largest country in the European Union. Its latitude puts part of the country in direct contact with the typical southern end of the Atlantic polar jet. Hence, Spain's geographical position allows for Atlantic fronts typically affecting its western and northern part whereas a Mediterranean influenced climate is generally prevalent in its eastern and southern parts, with transition climates linking both main bioclimatic regions. Additionally the presence of several mountain ranges ultimately shape the diverse landscape of Spain. Another remarkable feature of the country is its vast coast, as a result of being in a Peninsula; moreover, there is the coast of the two Spanish archipelagos: the Balearic Islands and the Canary Islands.

To date, Spain has a total of 15 National Parks, of which 10 are on the mainland, 1 in the Balearic Islands and 4 in the Canary Islands. Spain's most visited National Park is the Teide National Park in the Canary Islands, with 3,142,148 visitors in 2007 and crowned with the third largest Volcano in the world from its base, the Teide, with 3,718 meters above the sea level (also the highest point in Spain). The Teide also has the distinction of being the most visited national park in Europe and second in the world.

On top of that, by 2016 Spain is home to 48 biosphere reserves, covering 5.5 million hectares, almost 11% of the country, making Spain the world leader of such protected areas

== Art and culture ==
=== Museums in Madrid ===
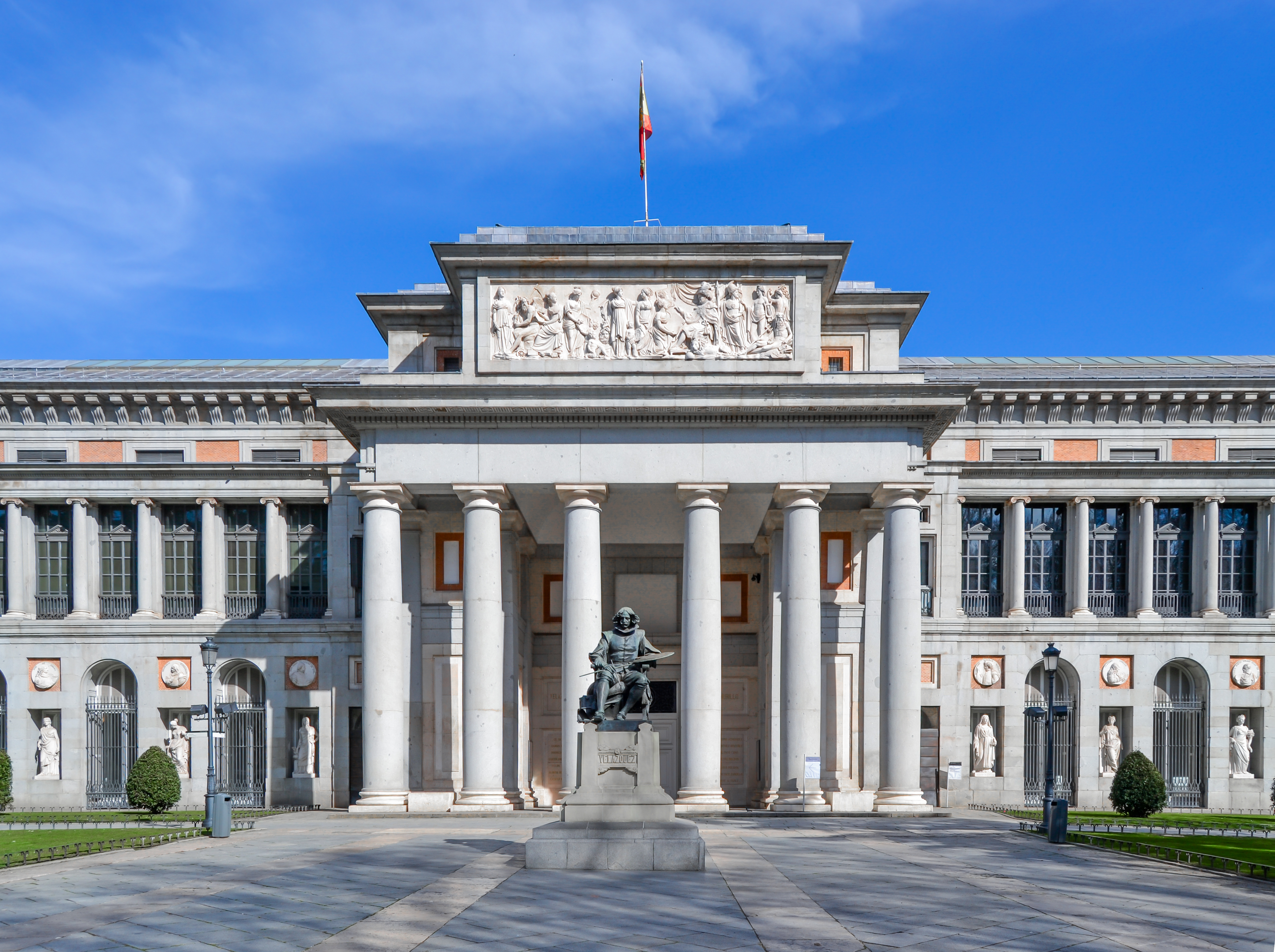
Museo del Prado

Madrid is considered one of the top European destinations concerning art museums. Best known is the Golden Triangle of Art, located along the Paseo del Prado and comprising three museums. The most famous one is the Museo del Prado, known for such highlights as Diego Velázquez's Las Meninas and Francisco de Goya's La maja vestida and La maja desnuda. The other two museums are the Thyssen Bornemisza Museum, established from a mixed private collection, and the Reina Sofia Museum, where Pablo Picasso's Guernica hangs, returning to Spain from New York after more than two decades.

The Museo del Prado is a museum and art gallery that features one of the world's finest collections of European art, from the 12th century to the early 19th century, based on the former Spanish Royal Collection. The collection currently comprises around 7,600 paintings, 1,000 sculptures, 4,800 prints and 8,200 drawings, in addition to a large number of works of art and historic documents. El Prado is one of the most visited museums in the world, and it is considered to be among the greatest museums of art. It has the best collection of paintings by Goya, Velázquez, El Greco, Patinir, José de Ribera, and other Spanish artists, as well as major collections of Rubens, Titian, Hieronymus Bosch, Rogier van der Weyden, Raphael, Tintoretto, Veronese, Caravaggio, Van Dyck, Albrecht Dürer, Claude Lorrain, Murillo and Zurbarán, among others.

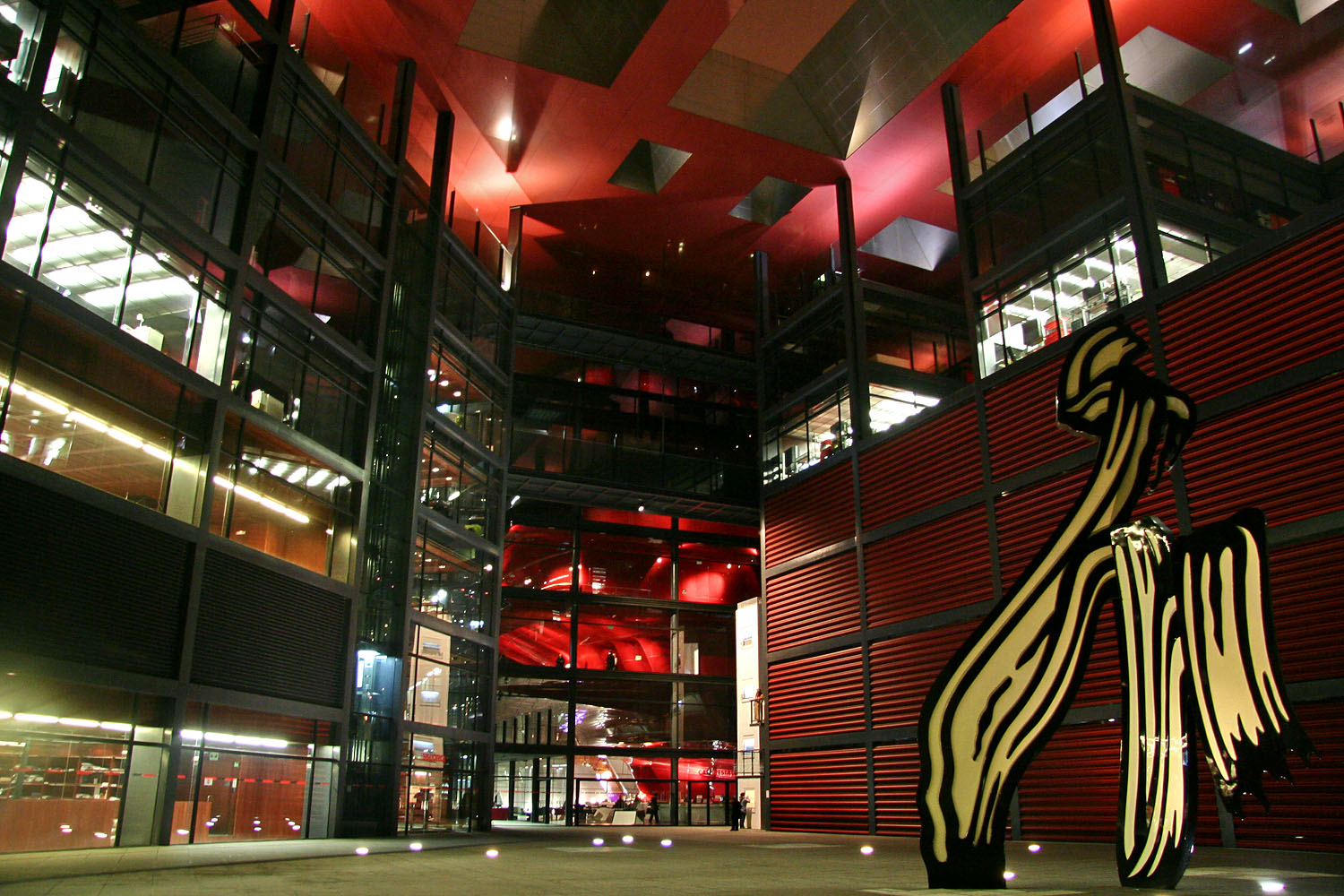
Museo Reina Sofía (MNCARS).

The Museo Nacional Centro de Arte Reina Sofía (MNCARS) is the Spain's national museum of 20th-century art. The museum is mainly dedicated to Spanish art. Highlights of the museum include excellent collections of Spain's greatest 20th-century masters, Pablo Picasso, Salvador Dalí, Joan Miró, Juan Gris and Julio González. Certainly the most famous masterpiece in the museum is Picasso's painting Guernica. The Reina Sofía also hosts a free-access library specializing in art, with a collection of over 100,000 books, over 3,500 sound recordings and almost 1,000 videos.

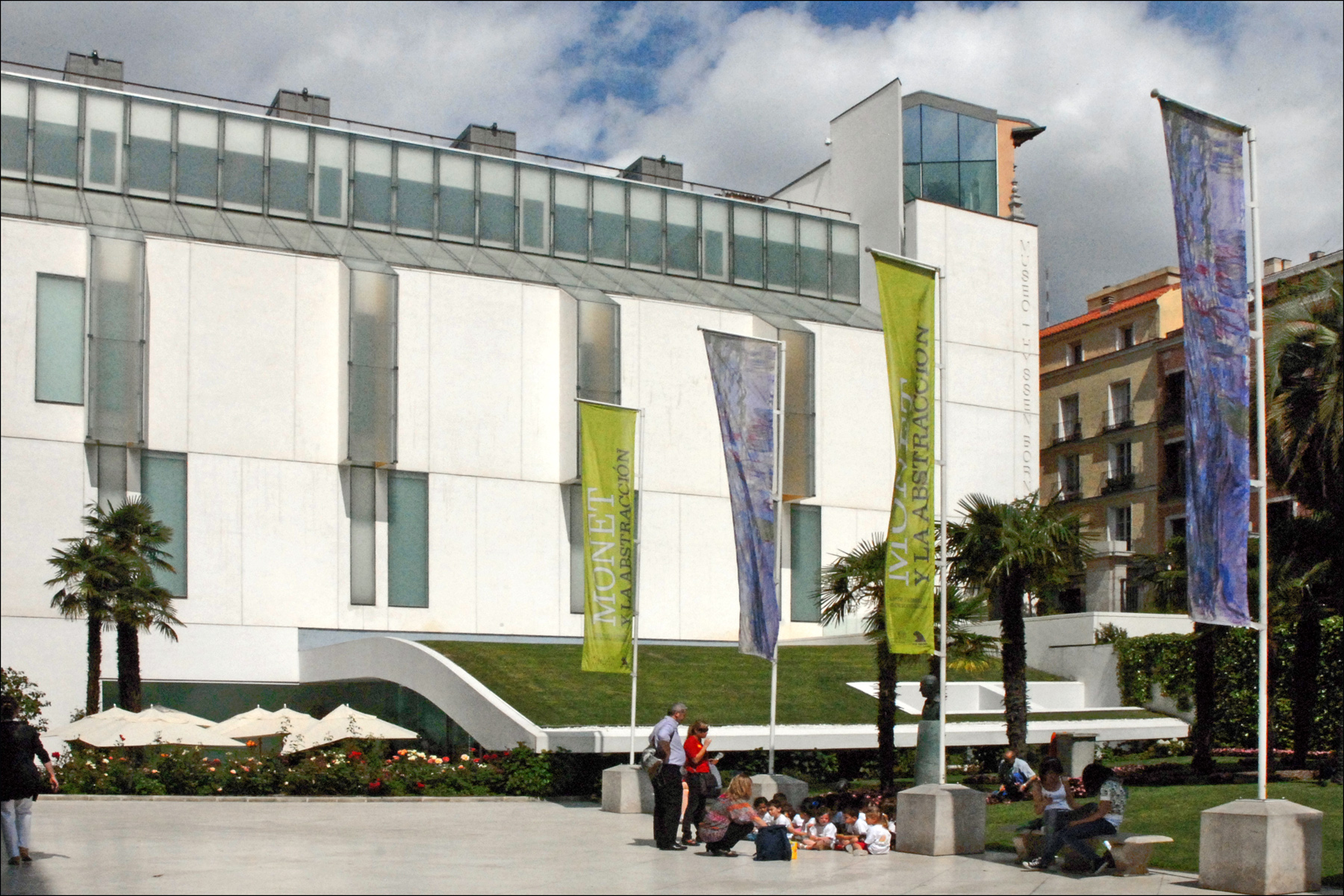
Thyssen-Bornemisza Museum

The Thyssen-Bornemisza Museum is an art museum that fills the historical gaps in its counterparts' collections: in the Prado's case this includes Early Italian painting and works from the English, Dutch and German schools, while in the case of the Reina Sofia the Thyssen-Bornemisza collection, once the second largest private collection in the world after the British Royal Collection, includes Impressionists, Expressionists, and European and American paintings from the second half of the 20th century, with over 1,600 paintings.

The Royal Academy of Fine Arts of San Fernando currently functions as a museum and gallery that houses a fine art collection of paintings from the 15th to 20th centuries: Giovanni Bellini, Correggio, Rubens, Zurbarán, Murillo, Goya, Juan Gris, Pablo Serrano. The academy is also the headquarters of the Madrid Academy of Art. Francisco Goya was once one of the academy's directors, and, its alumni include Pablo Picasso, Salvador Dalí, Antonio López García, Juan Luna, and Fernando Botero.

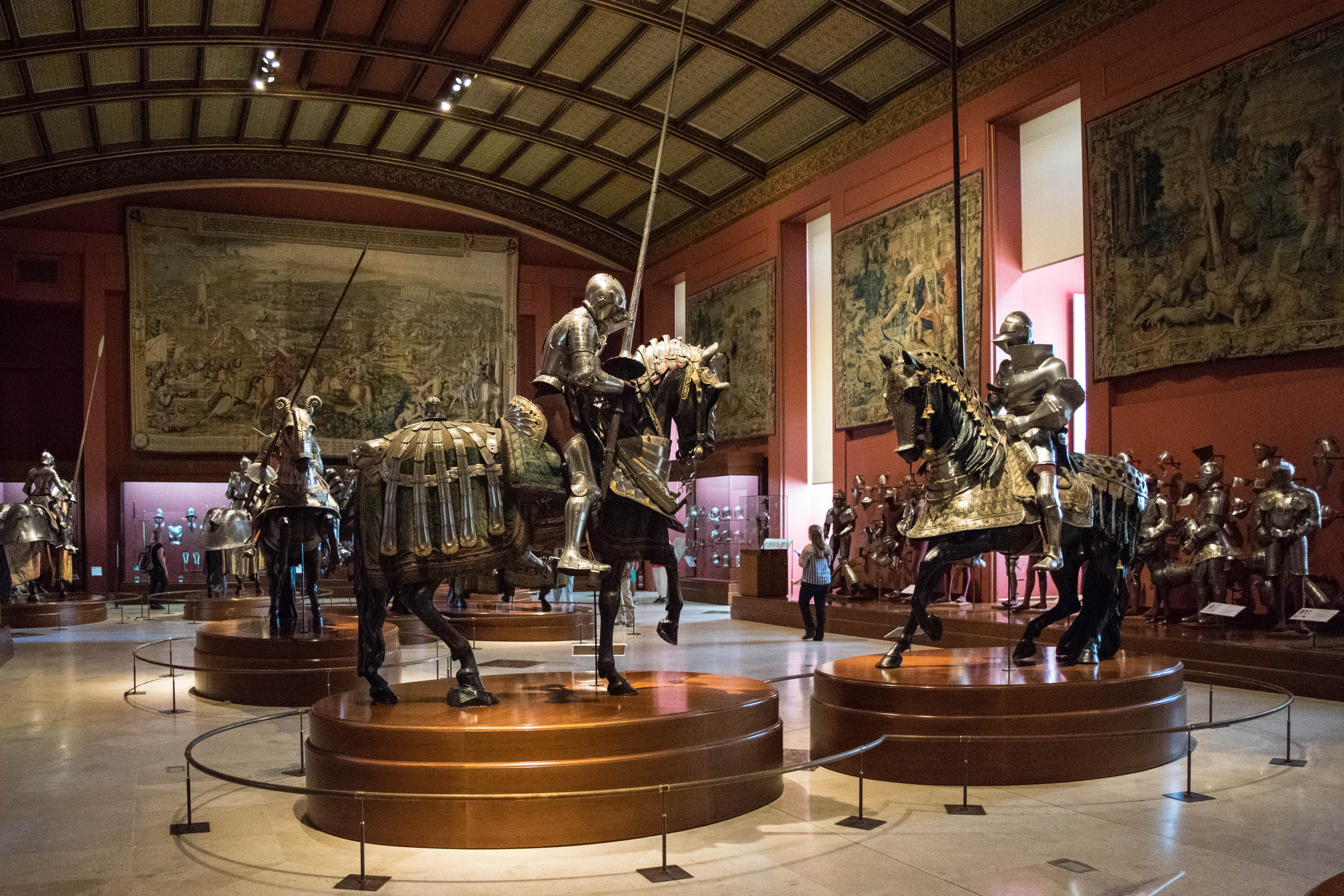
Royal Armoury, Royal Palace of Madrid.

The Royal Palace of Madrid is the official residence of Felipe VI of Spain, but he uses it only for official acts. It is a baroque palace full of artworks and one of the largest European Royal Palaces, which is characterized by its luxurious rooms and its rich collections of armors and weapons, pharmaceutical, silverware, watches, paintings, tapestries and the most comprehensive collection of Stradivarius in the world

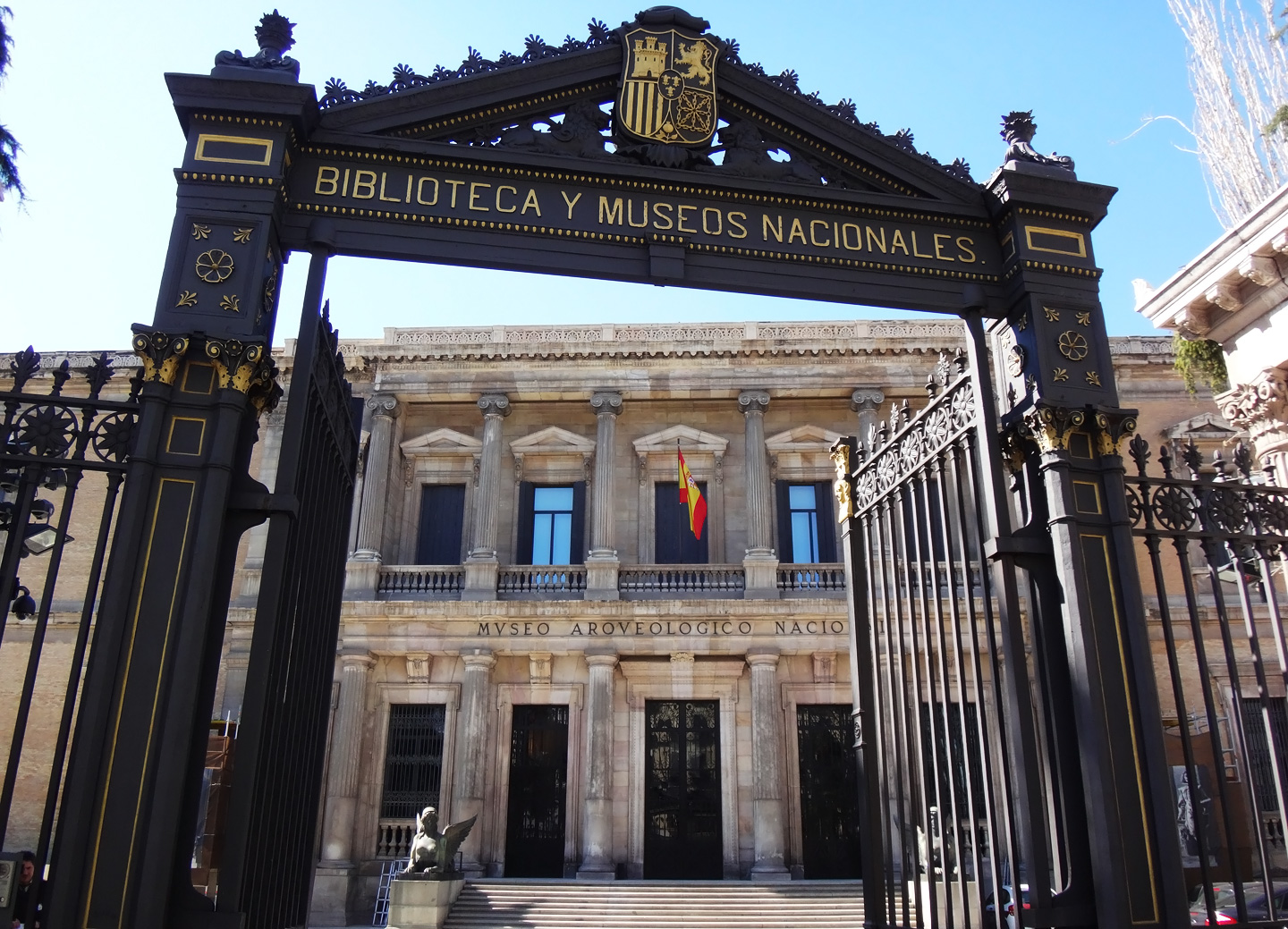
National Archaeological Museum of Spain

The National Archaeological Museum of Spain collection includes, among others, Pre-historic, Celtic, Iberian, Greek and Roman antiquities and medieval (Visigothic, Muslim and Christian) objects. Highlights include a replica of the Altamira cave (the first cave in which prehistoric cave paintings were discovered), Lady of Elche (an enigmatic polychrome stone bust), Lady of Baza (a famous example of Iberian sculpture), Biche of Balazote (an Iberian sculpture) and Treasure of Guarrazar (a treasure that represents the best surviving group of Early Medieval Christian votive offerings and the high point of Visigothic goldsmith's work).

The Museum of the Americas is a national museum that holds artistic, archaeological and ethnographic collections from the whole Americas, ranging from the Paleolithic period to the present day. The permanent exhibit is divided into five major thematical areas: an awareness of the Americas, the reality of the Americas, society, religion and communication.

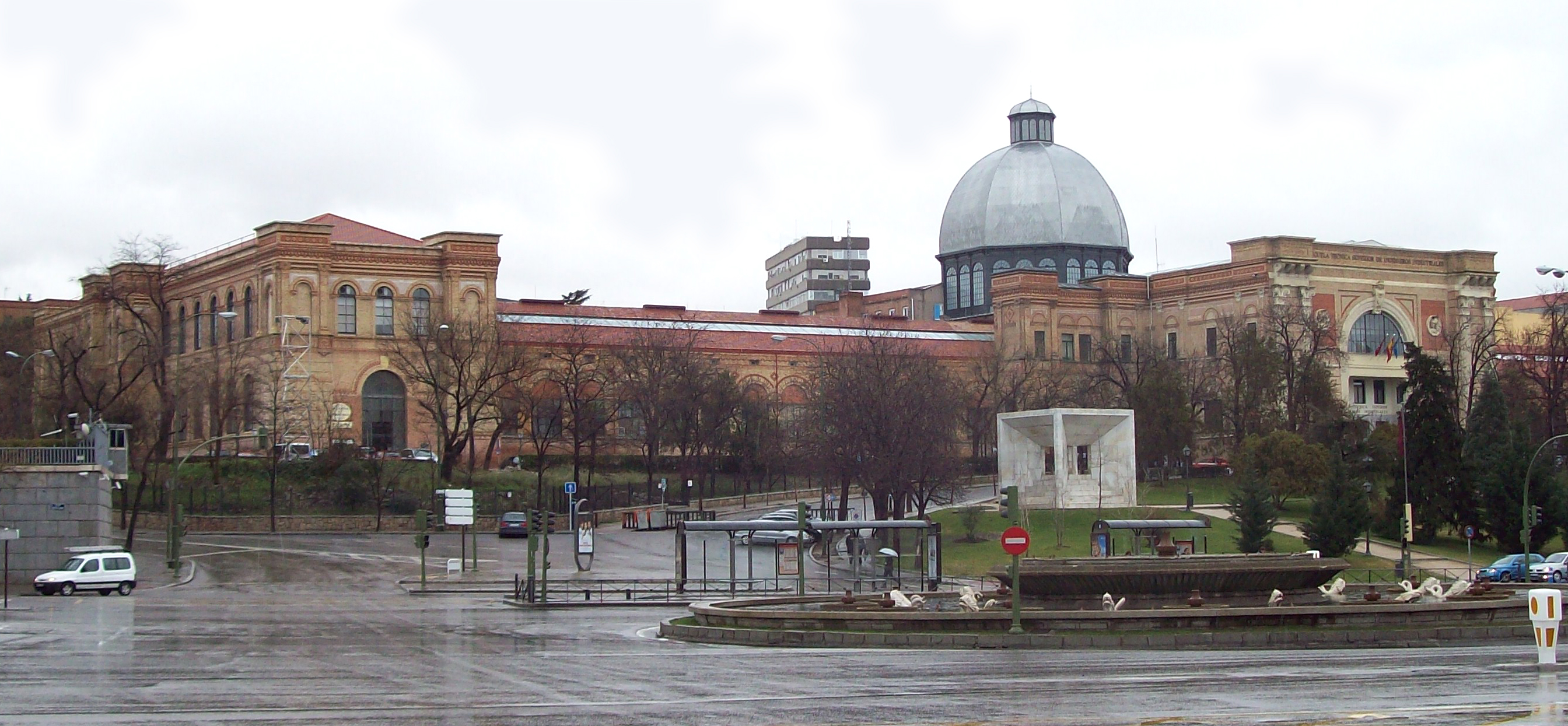
National Museum of Natural Sciences

The National Museum of Natural Sciences is the National Museum of Natural History of Spain. The research departments of the museum are: Biodiversity and Evolutionary Biology, Evolutionary Ecology, Paleobiology, Vulcanology and Geology.

The Naval Museum is managed by the Ministry of Defence. The Museum's mission is to acquire, preserve, investigate, report and display for study, education and contemplation, parts, sets and collections of historical, artistic, scientific and technical related to naval activity in order to disseminate the story sea of Spain; to help illustrate, highlight and preserve their traditions and promote national maritime awareness.

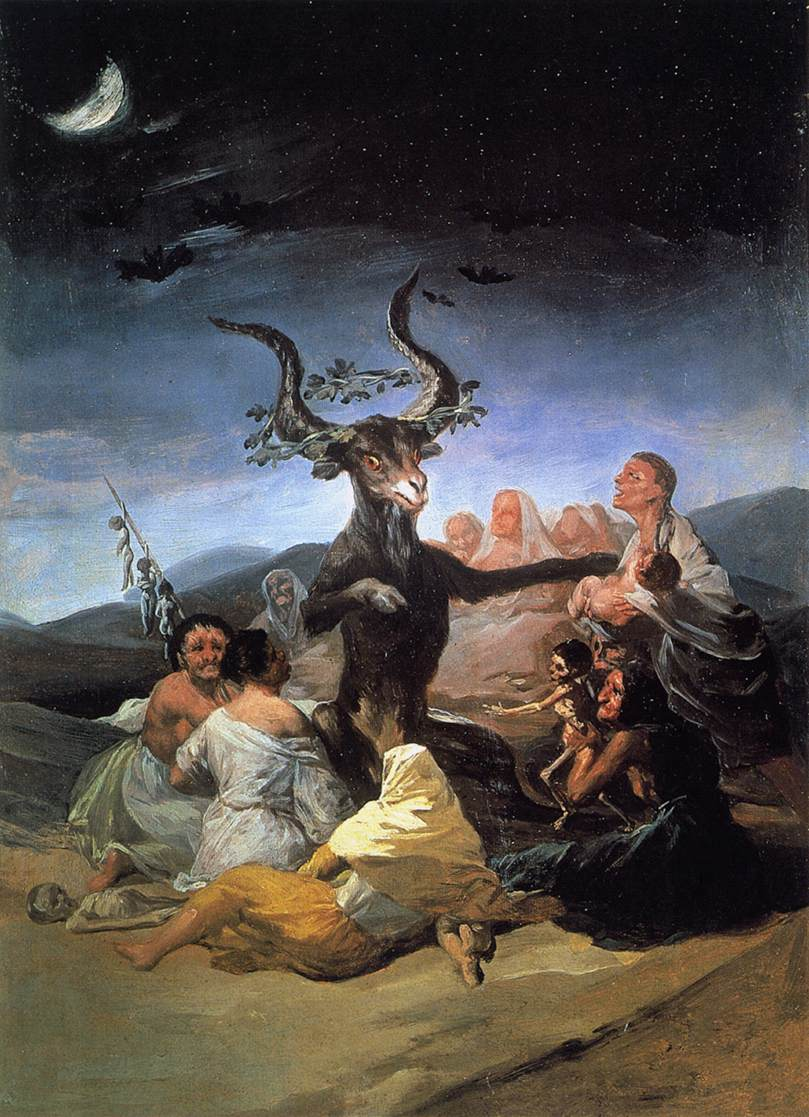
El Aquelarre, Francisco de Goya. Lázaro Galdiano Museum.

The Monastery of Las Descalzas Reales resides in the former palace of King Charles I of Spain and Isabel of Portugal. Their daughter, Joan of Austria, founded this convent of nuns of the Poor Clare order in 1559. Throughout the remainder of the 16th century and into the 17th century, the convent attracted young widowed or spinster noblewomen. Each woman brought with her a dowry. The riches quickly piled up, and the convent became one of the richest convents in all of Europe. It has many works of Renaissance and Baroque art, including a recumbent Christ by Gaspar Becerra, a staircase whose paintings were painted by unknown author (perhaps Velázquez) and they are considered of the masterpieces of Spanish illusionist painting, and Brussels tapestries inspired by paintings of Rubens.

The Museum of Lázaro Galdiano houses an encyclopedic collection specializing in decorative arts.

Apart from paintings and sculptures it displays 10th-century Byzantine enamel; Arab and Byzantine ivory chests; Hellenistic, Roman, medieval, renaissance, baroque and romantic jewelry; Pisanello and Pompeo Leoni medals; Spanish and Italian ceramics; Italian and Arab clothes and a collection of weapons including the sword of Pope Innocent VIII.

The Museo Nacional de Artes Decorativas (National Museum of Decorative Arts) is one of the oldest museums in the city. It illustrates the evolution of the called "minor arts" (furniture, ceramics and glass, textile, etc.). Its 60 rooms expones 15,000 objects, of the approximate 40,000 which it has.

The Museo Nacional del Romanticismo (National Museum of Romanticism) contains a large collection of artefacts and art, focusing on daily life and customs of the 19th century, with special attention to the aesthetics about Romanticism.

The Museo Cerralbo houses a private collection of ancient works of art, artifacts and other antiquities collected by Enrique de Aguilera y Gamboa, XVII Cerralbo Marquis.

The National Museum of Anthropology provides an overview of the different cultures in the world, with objects and human remains from around the world, highlighting a Guanche mummy of the island of Tenerife.

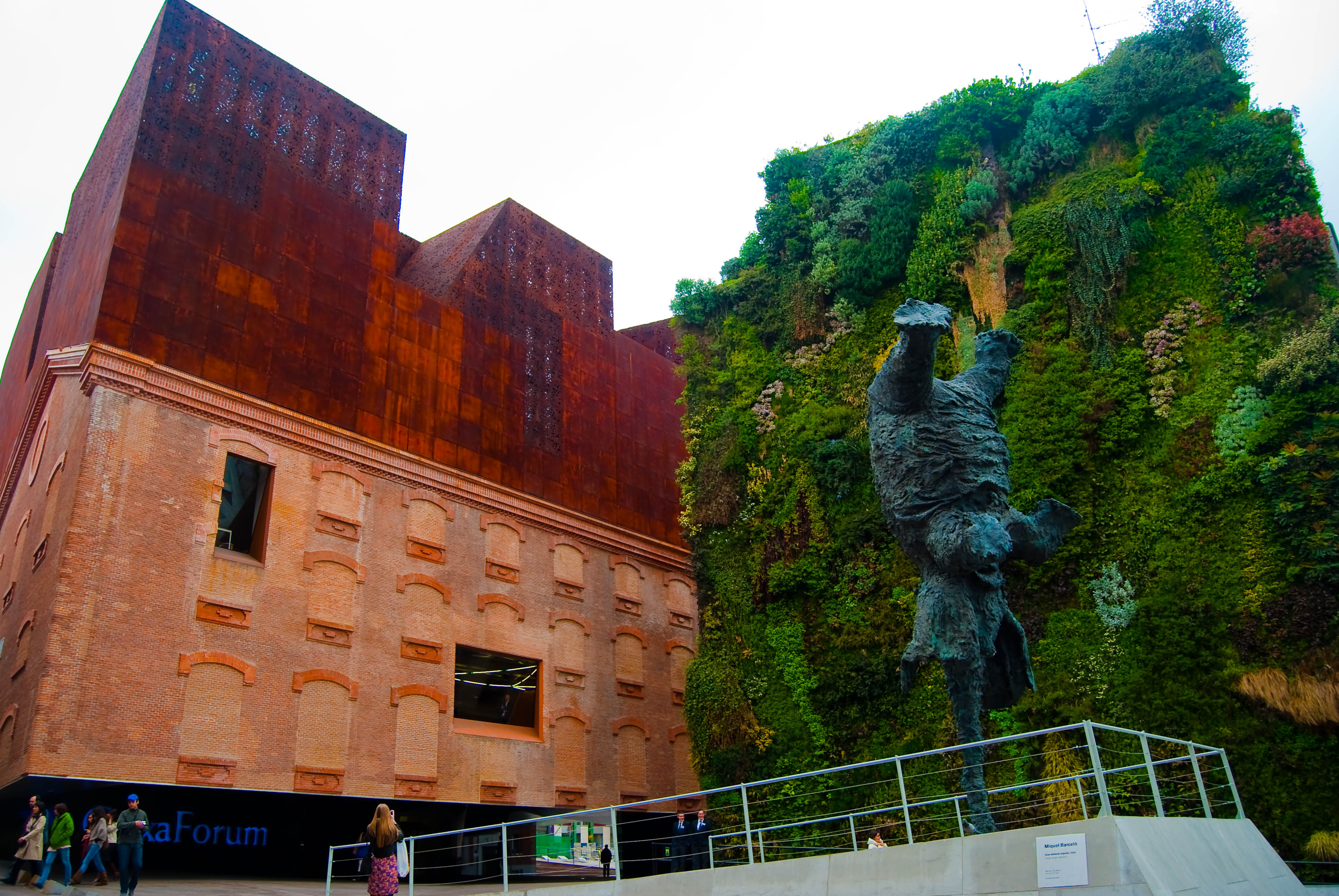
Caixa Forum Madrid.

The Museo Sorolla is located in the building in which the Valencian Impressionist painter had his home and workshop. The collection includes, in addition to numerous works of Joaquín Sorolla, a large number of objects that possessed the artist, including sculptures by Auguste Rodin.

CaixaForum Madrid is a post-modern art gallery in the centre of Madrid. It is sponsored by the Catalan-Balearic bank la Caixa and located next to the Salón del Prado. Although the CaixaForum is a modern building, it also exhibits retrospectives of artists from earlier time periods and has evolved into one of the most visited museums in Madrid. It was constructed by the Swiss architects Herzog & de Meuron from 2001 to 2007, which combined an old unused industrial building and hollowed it out at the base and inside and placed on top further floors which are encased with rusted steel. Next to it is an art installation of green plants growing on the wall of the neighbouring house by French botanist Patrick Blanc. The red of the top floors with the green of the wall next to it form a contrast. The green is in reflection of the neighbouring Royal Botanical Gardens.

Other art galleries and museums in Madrid include:

- Royal Palace of Madrid
- Royal Academy of Fine Arts of San Fernando
- National Archaeological Museum of Spain
- Museum of the Americas
- National Museum of Natural Sciences
- Liria Palace
- Naval Museum
- Spanish Air Force Museum
- Monastery of Las Descalzas Reales
- Museum of Lázaro Galdiano
- Royal Palace of El Pardo
- Railway Museum
- Museum Sorolla
- CaixaForum Madrid

=== Museums in Barcelona ===
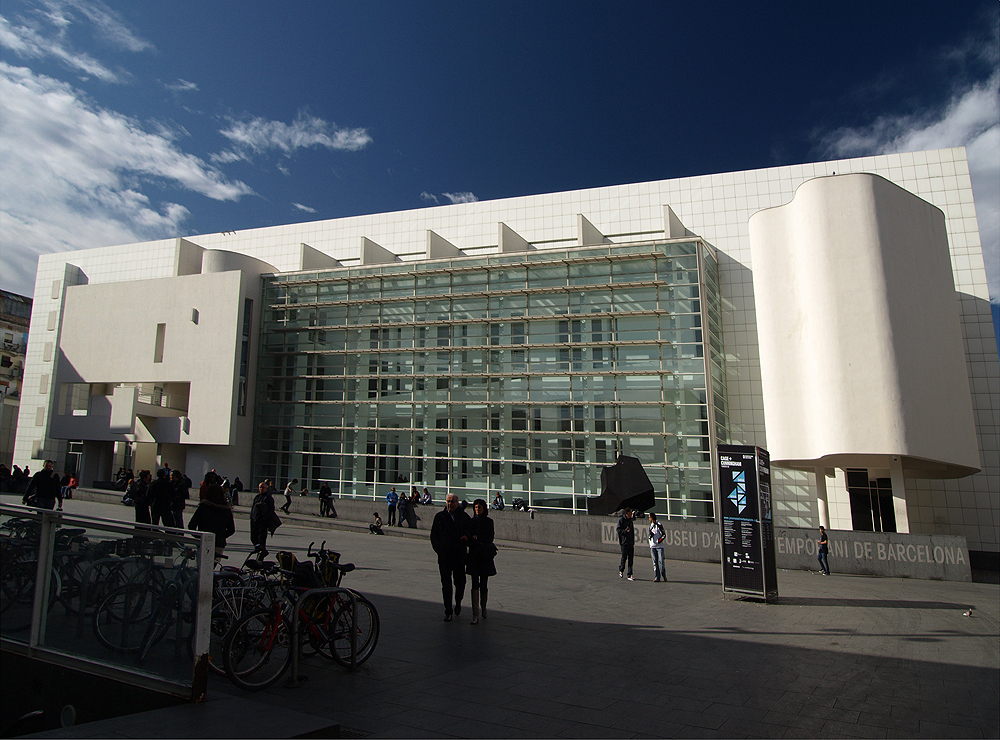
Museu d'Art Contemporani de Barcelona (MACBA).

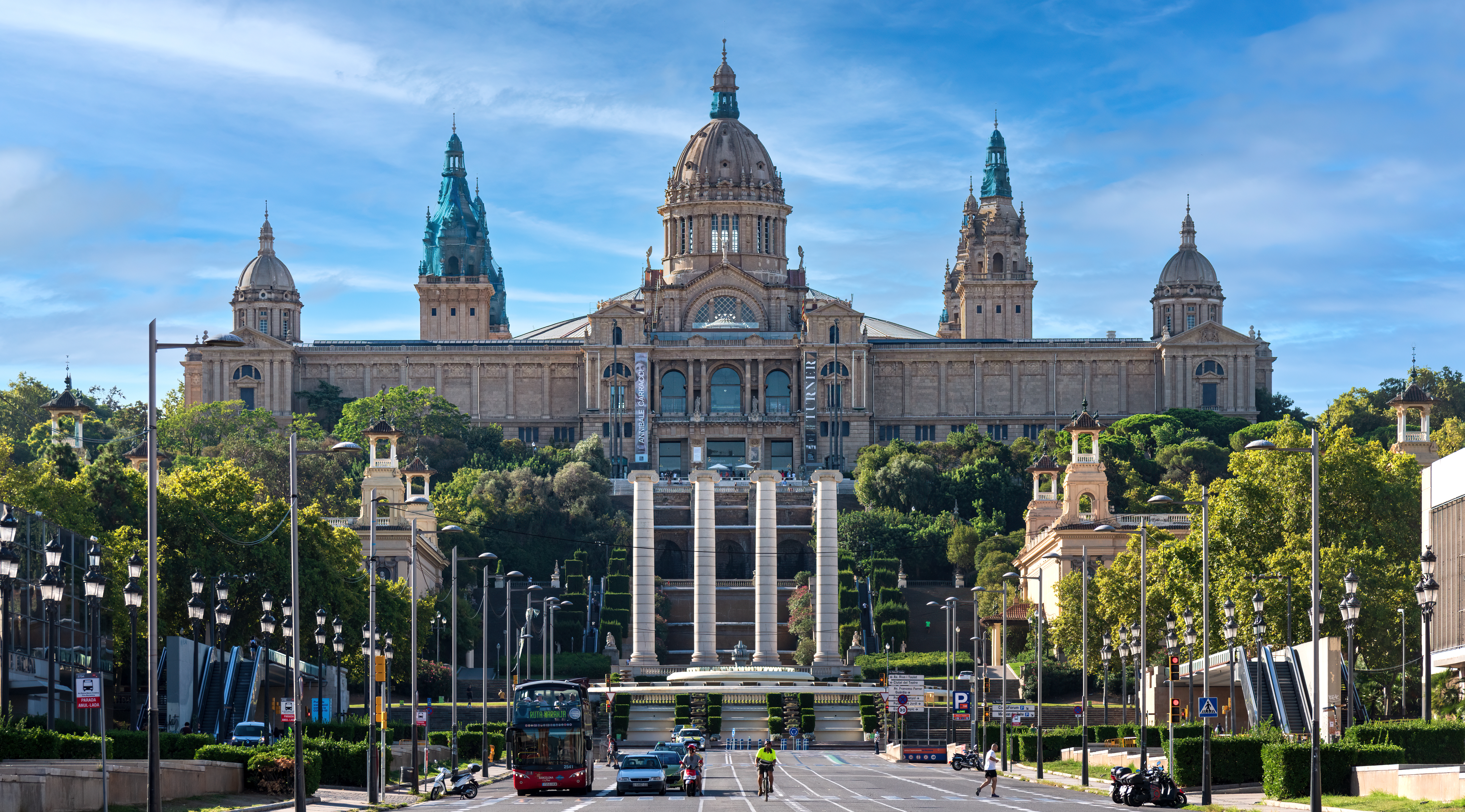
Museu Nacional d'Art de Catalunya (MNAC).

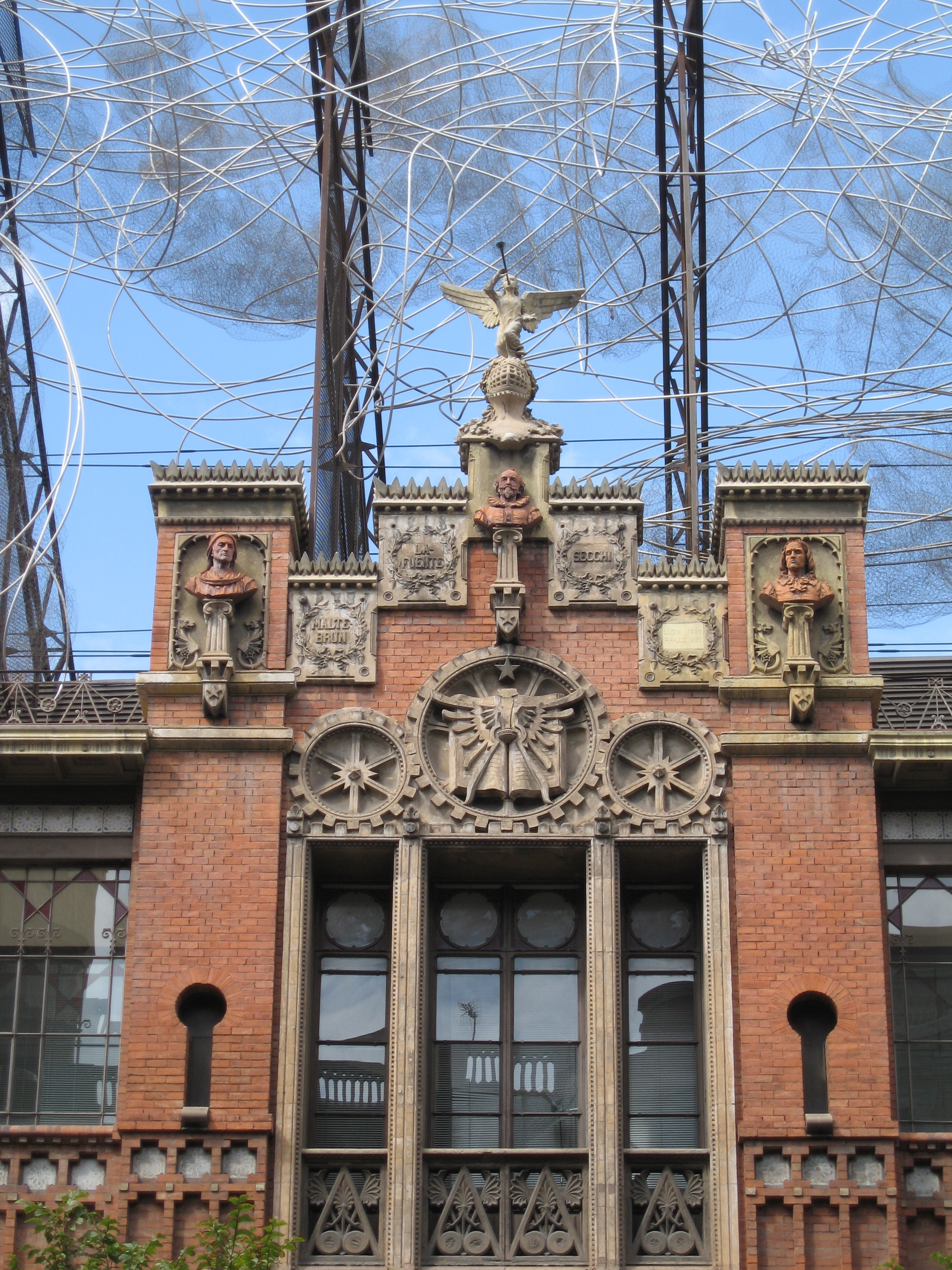
Fundació Antoni Tàpies.

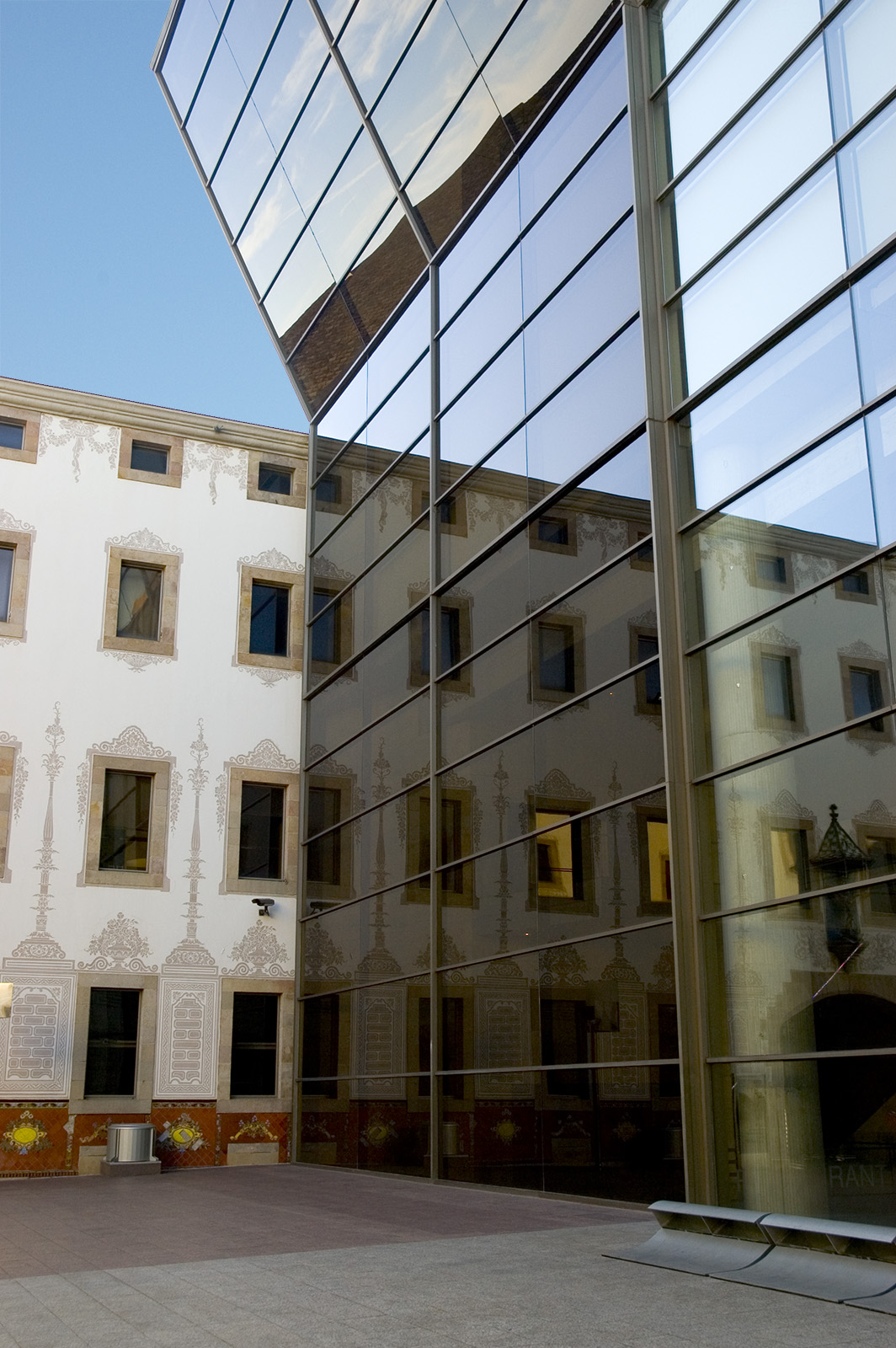
Centre de Cultura Contemporània de Barcelona (CCCB).

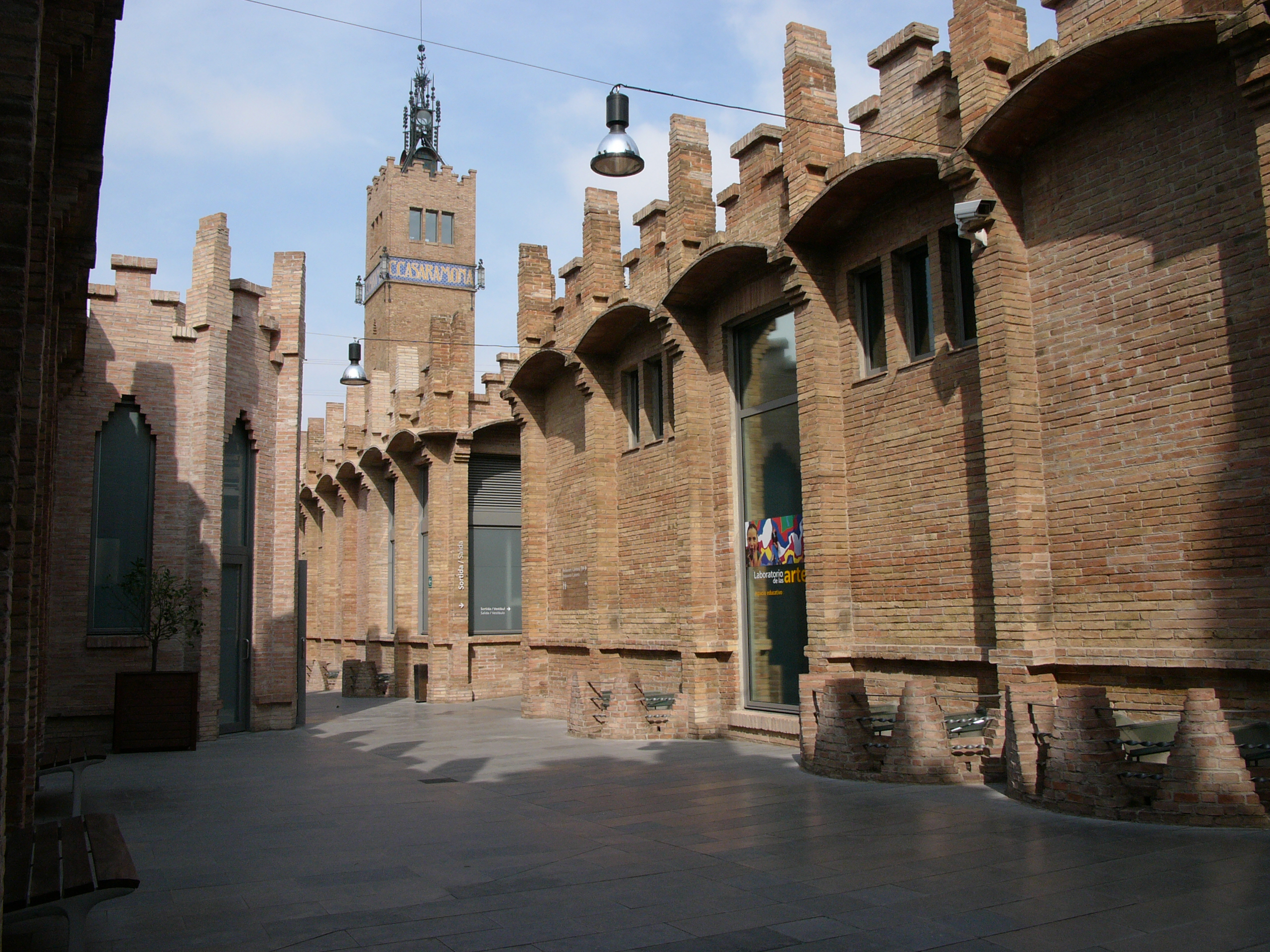
CaixaForum Barcelona.

This is a list of museums in Barcelona (Catalonia) and in its surrounding metropolitan area.

- Archaeology Museum of Barcelona (MAC)
- Museu d'Art Contemporani de Barcelona (MACBA)
- Museu del Modernisme Català MMCAT
- CaixaForum Barcelona
- Casa Àsia
- Centre d'Art Santa Mònica (CASM)
- Centre de Cultura Contemporània de Barcelona (CCCB)
- Cosmocaixa Barcelona (former Museu de la Ciència de Barcelona)
- Espai Gaudí (La Pedrera)
- Fundació Antoni Tàpies
- Olympic and Sports Museum Joan Antoni Samaranch
- Fundació Joan Miró
- Fundació Suñol
- FC Barcelona Museum
- Gracia Arts Project
- Royal Palace of Pedralbes
  - Museu de Ceràmica
  - Museu de les Arts Decoratives
  - Museu Tèxtil i d'Indumentària
- Moco Museum Barcelona
- Museu d'Autòmates
- Museu Barbier-Mueller d'Art Precolombí
- Museu del Calçat
- Museu de Cera de Barcelona
- Museum of Natural Sciences of Barcelona
  - Museum of Natural Sciences of Barcelona (the main exhibition site, at the Forum Building)
  - Martorell Museum (the historical site where the Museum of Natural Sciences of Barcelona was founded in 1882, but contained the Geology Museum from 1924 to 2010)
  - Laboratori de Natura, at the Castle of the Three Dragons (from 1920 to 2010: Zoology Museum)
  - Botanical garden of Barcelona
  - Historical Botanical Garden of Barcelona
- Museu del Clavegueram
- Museu del Còmic i la Il·lustració
- Egyptian Museum of Barcelona
- Museu de l'Eròtica de Barcelona
- Museu Etnològic de Barcelona
- Museu Frederic Marès
- Museu Gaudí
- Museu d'Història de Catalunya
- Museu d'Història de la Ciutat
  - Centre d'Interpretació del Park Güell
- Museu Marítim
- Museu Militar de Barcelona (closed May 2009)
- Museu de la Música de Barcelona
- National Art Museum of Catalonia (MNAC)
- Museu del Perfum - Fundació Planas Giralt
- Museu Picasso
- Museu Taurí
- Museu de la Xocolata
- Palau de la Virreina
- Palau Robert
- Sala Ciutat
- Sagrada Familia

=== Other major museums in Spain ===
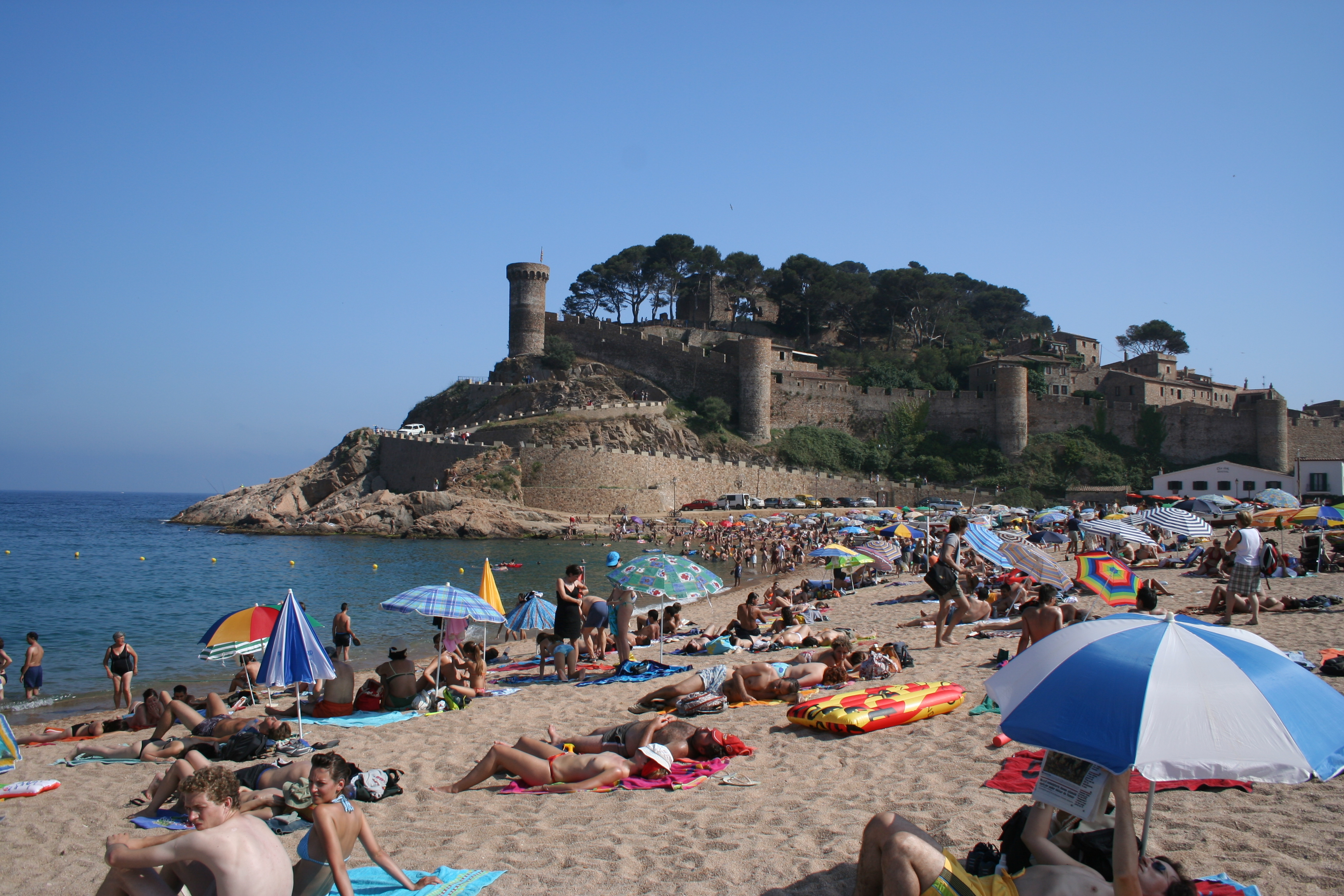
Tossa de Mar beach.

- Bilbao Fine Arts Museum
- Carmen Thyssen Museum in Málaga
- City of Arts and Sciences in Valencia
- Dalí Theatre and Museum in Figueres
- Guggenheim Museum Bilbao
- IVAM (Valencia)
- Museo Picasso Málaga
- Centro Pompidou Málaga
- Museu de Belles Arts de València
- National Museum of Sculpture in Valladolid
- Museum of Fine Arts of Seville

== Impact of COVID-19 ==
In early 2020, the country halted its tourism industry following the spread of COVID-19. Spain reopened to fully vaccinated travellers from around the world on 7 June 2021; however, due to the relatively late announcement of the reopening, the initial increase in visitors was gradual.

== See also ==
- Paradores
- Spanish cuisine
- 12 Treasures of Spain
