= The Ann and Gabriel Barbier-Mueller Museum =

Samurai museum in Dallas, Texas

Coordinates: 32°47′31″N 96°48′24″W

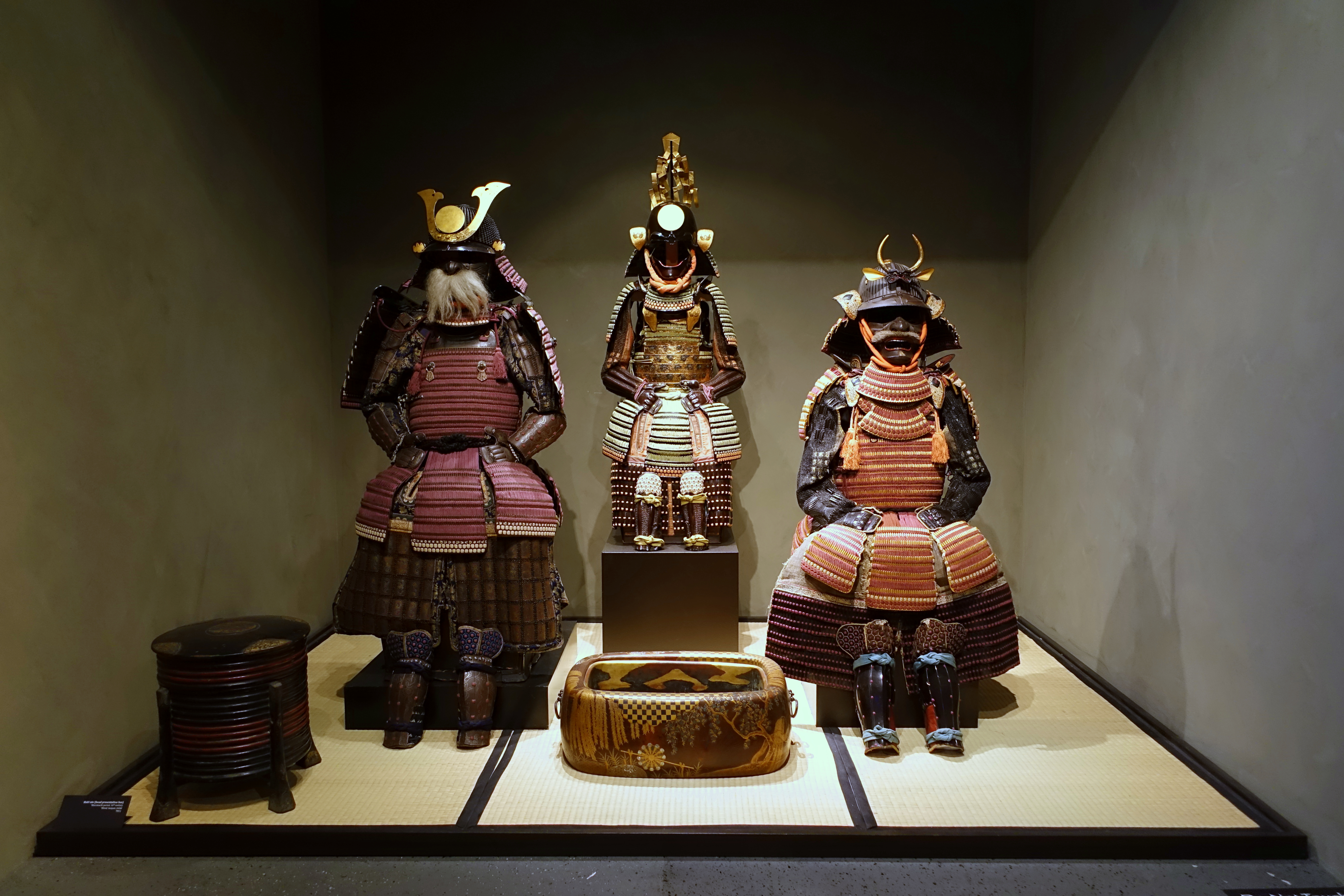
Samurai armor in the Ann and Gabriel Barbier-Mueller Museum

The Ann and Gabriel Barbier-Mueller Museum, also known as The Samurai Collection, is a museum of samurai armor located at 2501 North Harwood Street, Dallas, Texas, USA. It contains nearly three hundred Japanese samurai objects, including suits of armor, helmets, masks, horse armor, and weaponry, dating from the 12th to the 19th century AD with a focus on the Edo period.

== See also ==
- Barbier-Mueller Museum of tribal and classical antiquities, Geneva, Switzerland
