= Barbier-Mueller Museum =

Museum in Geneva, Switzerland

Barbier-Mueller Museum Musée Barbier-Mueller
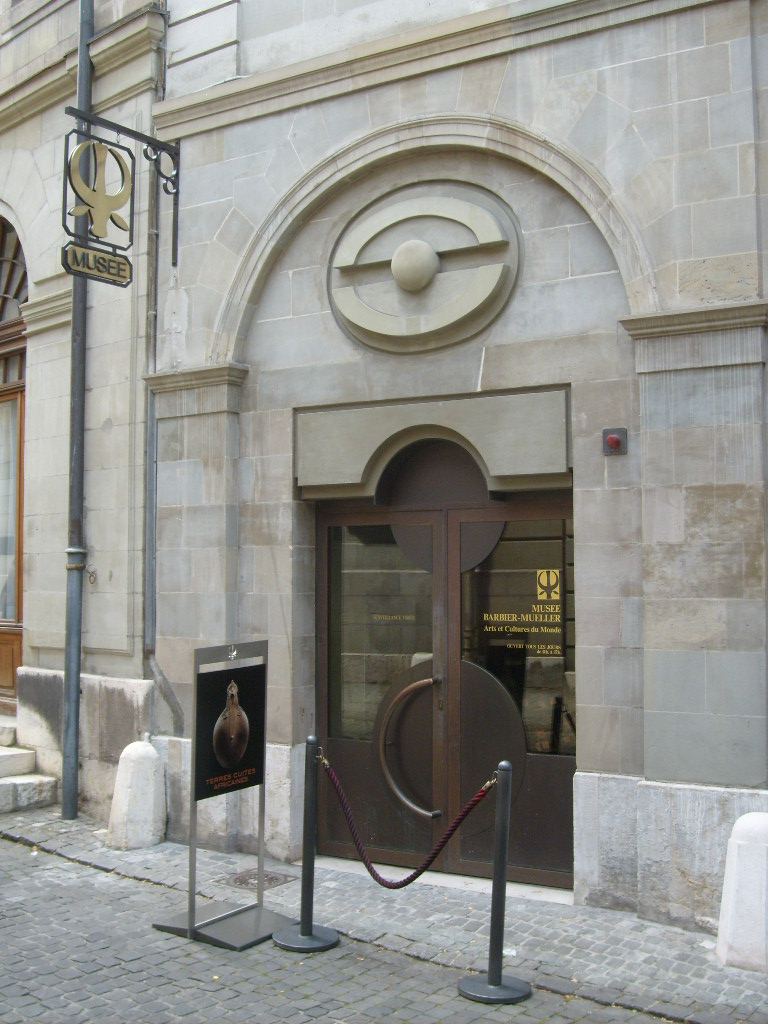
- Established: 1977
- Location: 10 rue Jean-Calvin; Genève, Switzerland
- Coordinates: 46.201807°N 6.146979°E
- Website: www.barbier-mueller.ch

The Barbier-Mueller Museum, founded in 1977, is located at 10 rue Jean-Calvin, in Geneva, Switzerland. Its collection contains over 7,000 pieces and includes works of art from Tribal and Classical antiquity as well as sculptures, fabrics and ornaments from "primitive" civilizations around the world. Its goal is to preserve, study, and publish the collection begun by Josef Müller in 1907 and carried on by his daughter Monique and son-in-law Jean Paul Barbier-Mueller.

The museum has gained international acclaim through itinerant exhibitions, the loans to other museums, and the publication of numerous catalogues and art books.

Twenty years later, in 1997, the Museu Barbier-Mueller d'Art Precolombí was inaugurated in Barcelona, Spain. It is located in the Nadal Palace, opposite to the Picasso Museum, in Montcada Street.

== See also ==
- List of museums in Switzerland

== See also ==
- The Ann and Gabriel Barbier-Mueller Museum of samurai armor, Dallas, Texas
