= Josef Müller (art collector) =

Swiss art collector (1887-1977)

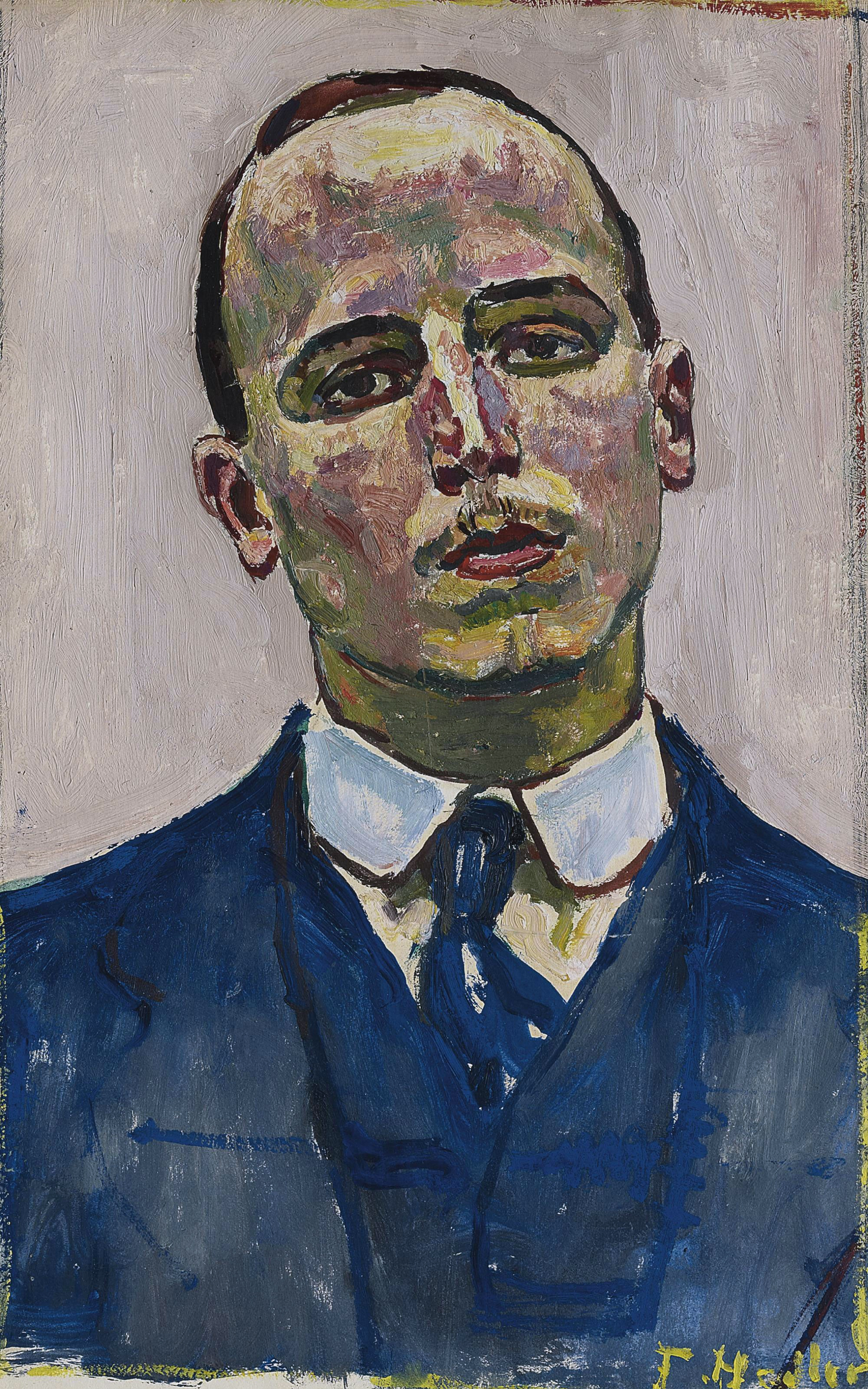
Josef Müller (Ferdinand Hodler)

Josef Müller (born 15 February 1887 in Solothurn; died 24 March 1977) was a Swiss art collector and curator.

== Biography ==
Josef Müller was the son of Josef Müller senior, co-founder of the Solothurn company Müller & Schweizer, which specializes in the manufacture of diversified watch parts, and Anna Müller, née Haiber. After the premature death of his parents, he was raised by a governess, completed a mechanical engineering degree at the Polytechnic in Zurich, completed an internship in the US from 1912 to 1914 and joined his father's company.

Eventually, Müller withdrew from the family business and turned to art. He became a student of Cuno Amiet and set up his own studio, initially in Geneva, and from 1922 in Paris. Müller - he began to collect modern, African, Asian, and ancient art - returned to Solothurn in 1942, where he worked as a curator at the Solothurn Art Museum from 1943 to 1967. He was a member and president of the Solothurn Art Commission and from 1954 to 1960 a member of the Federal Art Commission.

He married Louise Adèle Hortense née Ecuvillon in 1929.

In 1970 he was awarded the Culture Prize of the Canton of Solothurn.

Like his sister Gertrud Dübi-Müller, Müller maintained contacts with the most important Swiss artists of his time at a young age, such as Ferdinand Hodler, Cuno Amiet, Giovanni Giacometti, and Félix Vallotton. He acquired their works as well as those by Pablo Picasso, Paul Cézanne, Fernand Léger, Henri Matisse, and others. In 1969, he founded the Josef Müller Foundation and left part of his valuable art collection to the Solothurn Art Museum.

His extensive collection of non-European works has been included in the Barbier-Mueller Museum in Geneva, founded by his daughter Monique and his son-in-law Jean Paul Barbier-Mueller. The pre-Columbian art part has been shown in Barcelona since 1997 and was auctioned at Sotheby's in 2013, as neither the municipality nor the Spanish state could raise the funds for a purchase.

== Literature ==
- Matthias Oberli: Müller, Josef. In: Historical Lexicon of Switzerland .
- Swiss art in the Josef Müller Collection: Exhibition, City Museum of Solothurn, 15 June - 7 September 1975 . Vogt shield, 1975.
- Dübi Müller Foundation, Josef Müller Foundation . Solothurn Art Museum, 1981.
- Jean Paul and Monique Barbier-Mueller: From the life of a collector - Josef Müller 1887–1977 . Musée Barbier-Müller, 1989 ISBN 2881040209 .
- The art of collecting . Swiss Institute for Art Research, 1998, pp. 91–93, ISBN 3908184878 .
