= Museu Barbier-Mueller d'Art Precolombí =

Barbier-Mueller Pre-Columbian Art Museum
- Museu Barbier-Mueller d'Art Precolombí; Museo Barbier-Mueller de Arte Precolombino
- Established: 27 May 1997
- Location: Montcada, 14; Barcelona, Spain
- Coordinates: 41.38493°N 2.180864°E
- Type: Art museum Specialising in pre-Columbian artworks and artefacts
- Public transit access: Jaume I; Urquinaona
- Website: en.amigosprecolombino.es

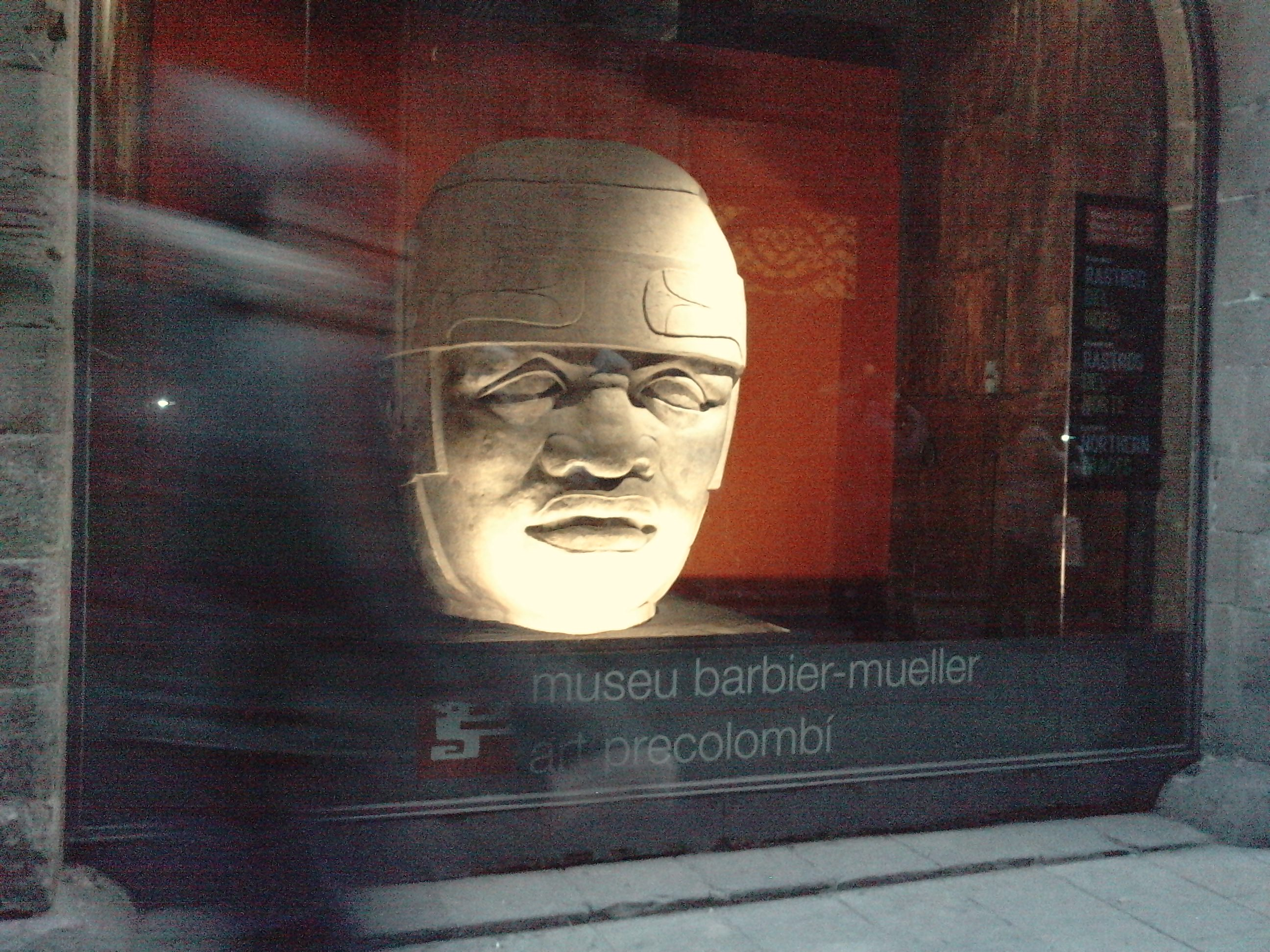
Museu Barbier Mueller from Carrer Montcada

The Museu Barbier-Mueller d'Art Precolombí (its local name in Catalan; also known in Spanish: Museo Barbier-Mueller de Arte Precolombino, and in English: Barbier-Mueller Pre-Columbian Art Museum) was the only museum in Europe devoted exclusively to the artistic legacy of the pre-Columbian cultures of the Americas. It was located in the Catalan capital of Barcelona, Spain. The museum was established in 1997 to house the pre-Columbian art collection formerly held by its parent museum, the Barbier-Mueller Museum in Genève, Switzerland, which was loaned to the city of Barcelona. In 2012, the museum was unable to reach a purchase agreement with the collection's owner Jean Paul Barbier-Mueller. Subsequently, the world's most important Pre-Columbian collection in private hands (according to El País) was split and auctioned at Southeby's on 22 March 2013.
