= List of museums in Barcelona =

This is a list of museums in Barcelona, the capital city of Catalonia, Spain.

Name	Acronym	Image	Neighbourhood	District	Type	Visitors (2018)	Summary
Moco Museum Barcelona	MOCO	Pilar Zeta's Field of Visions at Moco Museum Barcelona's Patio	Sant Pere, Santa Caterina i la Ribera	Ciutat Vella	Art		Modern & Contemporary Art Museum
Archaeology Museum of Catalonia (Barcelona)	MAC Barcelona		Poble-sec	Sants-Montjuïc	Archaeology	40,003	Barcelona venue of the Archaeology Museum of Catalonia
Barcelona Museum of Contemporary Art	MACBA		El Raval	Ciutat Vella	Art	331,694	Contemporary art museum
Centre de Cultura Contemporània de Barcelona	CCCB		El Raval	Ciutat Vella	Multipurpose	465,638	Contemporary arts centre
Centre de Documentació i Museu de les Arts Escèniques	MAE		Poble-sec	Sants-Montjuïc	Theater	20,000	Center for information and research on the performing arts
FC Barcelona Museum	-		La Maternitat i Sant Ramon	Les Corts	Sports	1,730,335	Stadium tour, history and memorabilia of the football club FC Barcelona
Maritime Museum of Barcelona	MMB		El Raval	Ciutat Vella	Maritime	301,836	Shipbuilding between the 13th and 18th century
Museum of the History of Barcelona	MUHBA		Gothic Quarter	Ciutat Vella	History	816,989	Historical heritage of the city of Barcelona, from its origins in Roman times until the present day. Main site at Casa Padellàs
Museum of the History of Catalonia	MHC		Barceloneta	Ciutat Vella	History	131,855	History and culture of Catalonia from prehistoric to modern times
Museu Nacional d'Art de Catalunya	MNAC		Poble-sec	Sants-Montjuïc	Art	891,346	National museum of Catalan visual art
Museu Picasso	-		Sant Pere, Santa Caterina i la Ribera	Ciutat Vella	Art	978,483	With 4,251 works exhibited, the museum has one of the most complete permanent collections of works by the 20th-century artist Pablo Picasso
Sagrada Família Museum	-		Sagrada Família	Eixample	Architecture	4,661,770	Architectural and construction history of the church
Centre d'Art Santa Mònica	CASM		El Raval	Ciutat Vella	Art	49,314	Traveling contemporary art exhibits
Arxiu Fotogràfic de Barcelona	AFB		Sant Pere, Santa Caterina i la Ribera	Ciutat Vella	Archive	9,120	Photographic collections about Barcelona
CaixaForum Barcelona	-		Montjuïc	Sants-Montjuïc	Art	863,605	
Can Framis Museum	-		El Parc i la Llacuna del Poblenou	Sant Martí	Art	15,770	Art centre for contemporary Catalan paintings
Casa Batlló	-		Dreta de l'Eixample	Eixample	Architecture	1,062,863	Building designed by Antoni Gaudí
Gaudí House Museum	-		La Salut	Gràcia	Historic home	293,000	Historic home museum dedicated to Antoni Gaudí
Casa Vicens	-		Vila de Gràcia	Gràcia	Architecture	139,500	House designed by Antoni Gaudí
Montjuïc Castle	-		Sant Pere, Santa Caterina i la Ribera	Ciutat Vella	Castle	831,210	Former military fortress
Cosmocaixa Barcelona	-		Sant Gervasi - la Bonanova	Sarrià-Sant Gervasi	Science	1,045,961	Science museum
El Born Cultural and Memorial Center	-		Sant Pere, Santa Caterina i la Ribera	Ciutat Vella	History	1,080,079	
Museu d'Autòmats	-		Tibidabo	Sarrià-Sant Gervasi	Amusement	105,527	Located in Tibidabo Amusement Park, collection of automata
Barcelona Pavilion	-		Montjuïc	Sants-Montjuïc	Architecture	85,993	Modernist building designed by Ludwig Mies van der Rohe and Lilly Reich
Design Museum of Barcelona	DHub		El Parc i Llacuna del Poblenou	Sant Martí	Design	169,293	
Fundació Antoni Tàpies	-		Dreta de l'Eixample	Eixample	Art	43,582	Art museum dedicated to Antoni Tàpies
Fundació Joan Miró	-		El Poble-sec	Sants-Montjuïc	Art	352,903	Art museum dedicated to Joan Miró
Espai Bombers	-		El Poble-sec	Sants-Montjuïc	Firefighting	19,177	Firefighting museum
Fabra i Coats: Centre d'Art Contemporani	-		Sant Andreu de Palomar	Sant Andreu	Art	16,169	Contemporary art center
Foto Colectania	-		Sant Pere, Santa Caterina i la Ribera	Ciutat Vella	Photography	25,020	Photography museum
Fran Daurel Museum	-		El Poble-sec	Sants-Montjuïc	Art	218,790	Museum dedicated to Catalan art
Fundació Suñol	-		La Maternitat i Sant Ramon	Les Corts	Art	6,521	Contemporary art museum
Fundación Mapfre Casa Garriga Nogués	-		La Vila Olímpica del Poblenou	Eixample	Art	97,932	Photography museum
Hemp Museum Gallery	-		Gothic Quarter	Ciutat Vella	Cannabis	15,653	
Casa Milà	-		Dreta de l'Eixample	Eixample	Architecture	934,524	Also known as La Pedrera, house designed by Antoni Gaudí
Virreina Palace	-		El Raval	Ciutat Vella	Art	122,644	Palace and contemporary art center
Museum of Mathematics of Catalonia	MMACA		Cornellà de Llobregat	Baix Llobregat	Mathematics	55,116	Interactive mathematics museum
Museum of Natural Sciences of Barcelona	MCNB		El Besòs i el Maresme	Sant Martí	Science	238,848	Natural history museum
Music Museum of Barcelona	-		Fort Pienc	Eixample	Music	39,248	
Museu de la Xocolata	-		Sant Pere, Santa Caterina i la Ribera	Ciutat Vella	Chocolate	132,758	
Museu del Modernisme de Barcelona	MMBCN		Dreta de l'Eixample	Eixample	Art	19,985	Museum dedicated to Catalan art nouveau style
Egyptian Museum of Barcelona	-		Dreta de l'Eixample	Eixample	Archaeology	270,097	
Museum of Ethnology and World Cultures	MUEC				Ethnology	61,016	Two locations: one in Montjuic Park and El Born
Museu Frederic Marès	-		Gothic Quarter	Ciutat Vella	Art	55,947	Sculpture museum
Joan Antoni Samaranch Olympic and Sport Museum	-		El Poble-sec	Sants-Montjuïc	Sports	44,586	
Palau Robert	-		Dreta de l'Eixample	Eixample	Art	976,276	Rotating art exhibitions
Recinte Modernista de Sant Pau	-		El Guinardó	Horta-Guinardó	Architecture	276,358	Former hospital and art nouveau complex
Monastery of Pedralbes	-		Pedralbes	Les Corts	Religious	74,898	Former Gothic monastery
Museu Diocesà de Barcelona	-		Gothic Quarter	Ciutat Vella	Religious		Located near the Cathedral of Barcelona
Poble Espanyol	-		El Poble-sec	Sants-Montjuïc	Architecture		Open-air architecture museum
Can Framis Museum	-		El Parc i Llacuna del Poblenou	Sant Martí	Art		Part of the Fundació Vila Casas, contemporary Catalan art museum
Espai Volart	-		Dreta de l'Eixample	Eixample	Art		Part of the Fundació Vila Casas, temporary contemporary art exhibitions
European Museum of Modern Art	MEAM		Sant Pere, Santa Caterina i la Ribera	Ciutat Vella	Art		Contemporary art museum
Fundació Rocamora	-		El Putxet i el Farró	Sarrià-Sant Gervasi	Art		
Espai Subirachs	-		El Poble-sec	Sants-Montjuïc	Art		Museum dedicated to Josep Maria Subirachs
Galeria Mayoral	-		Dreta de l'Eixample	Eixample	Art		
Museum of Modernism	MMCAT		Dreta de l'Eixample	Eixample	Art		Museum dedicated to Catalan modernism
Perfume Museum	-		Dreta de l'Eixample	Eixample	Collection		Collection of perfume bottles through history
Erotic Museum of Barcelona	MEB		Gothic Quarter	Ciutat Vella	Anthropology		History of human sexuality and erotica
Wax Museum of Barcelona	-		Gothic Quarter	Ciutat Vella	Collection		Collection of wax figures
Museu Geològic del Seminari de Barcelona	-		L'Antiga Esquerra de l'Eixample	Eixample	Science		Natural science museum
Museum and Study Center of Sport Doctor Melcior Colet	-		L'Antiga Esquerra de l'Eixample	Eixample	Sports		
Gaudí Experiència	-		La Salut	Gràcia	Art		4D film about Antoni Gaudí and museum dedicated to Gaudí
KBr Photography Center	-		La Vila Olímpica del Poblenou	Eixample	Photography		Part of the Fundación Mapfre, rotating photography exhibits
Funeral Carriages Collection, Montjuïc Cemetery	-		El Poble-sec	Sants-Montjuïc	Collection		Located in the Montjuïc Cemetery

== Defunct museums ==
- Museu Barbier-Mueller d'Art Precolombí
- Museu Clarà
- Museu d'Art Modern
- Museu de la Ciència de Barcelona
- Museu de la Moto
- Museu del Calçat
- Museu del Clavegueram
- Museu del Còmic i la Il·lustració (closed 2009)
- Museu del Gabinet Numismàtic de Catalunya
- Museu d'Idees i Invents
- Museu del Mamut
- Museu del Rock
- Museu Fundació Francisco Godia
- Museu Militar de Barcelona (closed May 2009)
- Museu Municipal de Belles Arts
- Museu Pedagògic Experimental
- Museu Provincial d'Antiguitats
- Museu Social
- Palau Reial de Pedralbes (closed 2013)
  - Ceramics Museum (now part of the Design Museum of Barcelona)
  - Museu de les Arts Decoratives (now part of the Design Museum of Barcelona)
  - Museu Tèxtil i d'Indumentària (now part of the Design Museum of Barcelona)
  - Gabinet de les Arts Gràfiques (now part of the Design Museum of Barcelona)
- Blueproject Foundation

== See also ==
- List of libraries in Barcelona
- List of markets in Barcelona
- List of theatres and concert halls in Barcelona
- List of museums in Catalonia
