= Luis Gueilburt =

Argentinian sculptor

- Born: 1950 (age 75–76); Buenos Aires, Argentina
- Known for: Painting, sculpture

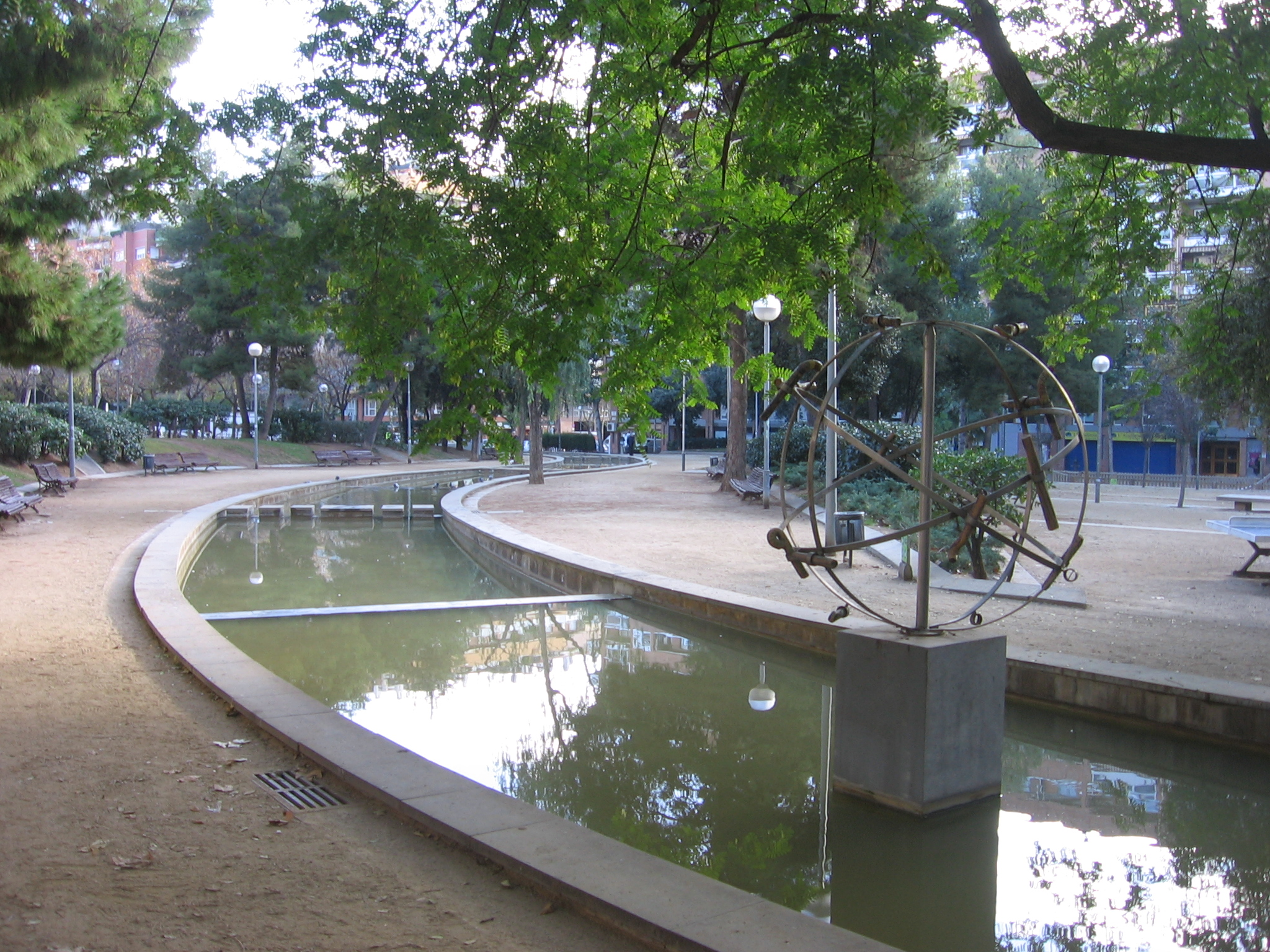
Euclidean (1989), Les Corts Park, Barcelona

Luis Gueilburt Talmazán (Buenos Aires, 1950) is an Argentinian sculptor, painter and writer based in Barcelona (Spain). He has exhibited his work in Reus, Mollet del Vallès, Vic, Moià and Nagoya (Japan). In the course of his academic research of Catalan modernism and Antoni Gaudí, he has written several books on the subject.

His work is framed in a figurative but not realistic style, developed in various supports and materials, such as wood, stone or metal, as well as artistic installations.

== Life ==
He studied Fine Arts (Sculpture specialty) at the Municipal School of Avellaneda. Between 1968 and 1978 he participated in various individual and collective exhibitions in several Latin American countries. In 1978 he settled in Barcelona. His works are in public and private collections in Spain, Japan, Argentina, Mexico, Guatemala, Ecuador and Peru.

In 1989 he made a sculpture that joined the Public Art collection of Barcelona, Euclidean or The Four Elements, located in park Les Corts. It is placed inside the water, in a meandering channel that runs through the park. Made of stainless steel and ceramic on a limestone base, it is conceived as a tribute to the Greek geometer Euclid. The work consists of four stainless steel railing circles supported by a vertical tube in the center of the diameter, in addition to several metal clamps set in the circles, which hold cylindrical ceramic pieces. Thirteen of these elements are found, which could refer to the thirteen volumes of the Euclidean treatise, where he exposes his studies on plane geometry, the geometry of space, proportions, greater magnitudes and the properties of numbers amongst others.

That year he won the contest for the elaboration of a statuette awarded to the winners of the Surbisa Prize for rehabilitation in Bilbao, established in 1985.

In 1992 he produced a public piece for Mollet del Vallès, Monument to Mollet Ciutat Pubilla de la Sardana, in Can Mulà park, in celebration to the city's appointment as Capital of Sardana that year. It is a work of iron and cast stone with a legend of wrought copper and bronze, consisting of an M (for Mollet) around one of whose legs a group of sculpted children is dancing sardana.

In 2000 he made the sculpture Ribbons for the campus of Keio University, in Shin Kawasaki, Tokyo.

As an expert in the work of the modernist architect Antoni Gaudí, he has taught a monographic course on the life and work of Gaudí at the Polytechnic University of Catalonia since 1997. In the same center he has been in charge of the Research Line Gaudí and Catalan Modernism, the architectural and artistic style of 1900 since 1998. He has also participated in courses, conferences, seminars and congresses in various universities in Spain, France, United States, Mexico, Italy and Argentina. Between 1993 and 2003 he directed the Center for Gaudí Studies. As a sculptor he was responsible for the restoration of some of Gaudí's works, such as the gate dragon at Güell Pavilions (1984), commissioned by the Gaudí Chair. Between 1990 and 1998 he participated in the restoration of the Gaudí House Museum in Park Güell. With some pieces of Gaudí's works recovered from these restorations, he organized the Gaudir Gaudí exhibition ("enjoy Gaudí") with the Association of Surveyors, Technical Architects and Building Engineers of Barcelona, which was exhibited in Vic, Mollet del Vallès and Nagoya (Japan) between 1993 and 1996.

He has also carried out restorations of various sculptures and monuments, such as those of the Thomas and Lleó Morera houses by Lluís Domènech i Montaner (1985), the Roca i Pi Monument by Torquat Tasso in Badalona (1985), the sculptures of the Albéniz Palace and the Robert Palace in Barcelona (1986), the Monument to Mosén Jacint Verdaguer by Joan Borrell i Nicolau (1987) and the Monument to General Geroni Galceràn i Tarrés in Les Masies de Voltregà (2003).

Some of his publications are: Ceramics in Gaudí's work (2002, with Maria Antonia Casanovas and Juan Bassegoda), Colegio de las Teresianas de Gaudí: history and architecture (2002, with Carmen Barranco, Benet Meca and Laura Ortiz), Gaudí Album, Barcelona (2002), Gaudí and the Property Registry (2003), Obradores - Obradoiros Gaudí (2006, with Marisa García Vergara), Hierro y Forja (2009, with Àlex Sánchez Vidiella).

== Individual exhibitions ==
- 1987: Lost Universes, Art Workshop School of Diputació de Tarragona, Reus.
- 1987: Bibliomeca, installation in the Anar i Tornar space of the Association of Surveyors, Technical Architects and Building Engineers of Barcelona.
- 1988: Camí Sinuós, Berlin Center B.C.B. (Contemporary Ballet of Barcelona).
- 1991: Mater Materia, Gloria de Prada Gallery, Barcelona.
- 1993: Gaudir Gaudí, Association of Surveyors, Technical Architects and Building Engineers of Barcelona and Osona, Vic.
- 1994: Gaudir Gaudí, La Marineta, Mollet del Vallès.
- 1996: Gaudir Gaudí, Chukyo University, Nagoya, Japan.
- 2000: In praise of the Shadows, H2O Gallery, Barcelona.
