= Antoni Llena =

Spanish artist (born 1942)

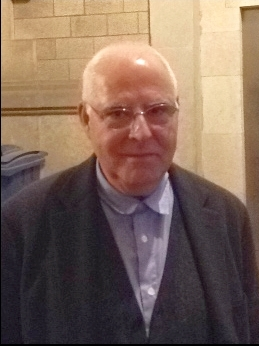
- Born: January 1, 1942 (age 84); Barcelona, Spain
- Occupation: artist

Antoni Llena (born 1942, Barcelona) is a Spanish artist.

A forerunner of conceptual art in Spain, he began his artistic career in the mid-1960s. When he started painting, he was concerned with expressing his historical time, without needing to give up on memories of the past or the desire to affirm the uncertainty of the future. In the late 1960s he completed his well-known series of desiccated sculptures. In 1969, along with Jordi Galí, Silvia Gubern and Àngel Jové, he created Primera mort, considered the first video art piece in Spain.

He held his first individual show that same year at the Petite Galerie in Lleida, where he exhibited silhouettes of the shadows of his paper sculptures, drawn directly on the walls of the exhibition space. In the early 1970s he decided to abandon his artistic practice, which he resumed in 1979 with the series of cut-outs shown at the Fundació Joan Miró in 1988. In the late 1980s he began incorporating new materials – stone, glass, tissue paper, iron, styrofoam, etc. – and his work transitioned toward three-dimensional paintings. It was at that time that his large series began appearing: Epifanies i sofismes, Et in Arcadia Ego, Preposicions, Velletque videre, Sense penediment, Viatge d’hivern. Since 2005 he has been working on the series SOS: senyals de fum des d’un subsòl. He sorts the drawings by month and arranges them in pairs like the pages of a book. He has been a professor of artistic literature at the University of Girona and has directed art workshops at EINA, University School of Design and Art in Barcelona. He served as curator for the exhibitions The anxiety of Influences. Tàpies Seen by Llena (Fundació Tàpies, 1991) and Antoni Bernad. North/South/E ast/West (Palau Robert, 2018)

In addition to his role as a regular contributor to written media, he has published the books La gana de l’artista (1999) and Per l’ull de l’art (2008). He is the creator of public sculptures, including David i Goliat (Barcelona, 1992) and Homenatge als Castellers (Barcelona, 2011), among others.

His work has been included in public collections at institutions such as Fundació Antoni Tàpies (Barcelona), Fundació ”la Caixa” (Barcelona), Fundació Joan Miró (Barcelona), Museu d’Art Contemporani de Barcelona, Museo Nacional Centro de Arte Reina Sofía (Madrid), Patio Herreriano - Museo de Arte Contemporáneo Español (Valladolid) and the Museum of Modern Art (New York).

== Solo exhibits ==
His notable individual exhibitions include, among others: Antoni Llena (Fundació Joan Miró, Barcelona, 1988), La pintura como experiencia (Patio Herreriano - Museo de Arte Contemporáneo Español, Valladolid, 2005), SOS: senyals de fum des d’un subsòl (Centre d’Art Tecla Sala, l’Hospitalet, 2011) and Antoni Llena. The Practice of Dispossession (Henrique Faria Fine Art, New York, 2019)

- 20019- Antoni Llena. The Practice of Dispossession
- 2012 - Antoni Llena. Obres 1967-2012, Galeria A/34, Barcelona
- 2011 - SOS: Senyals de fum des d'un subsòl, Centre d'art Tecla Sala, l'Hospitalet de Llobregat (Barcelona)
- 2010 - Nadala, Abans no canti el gall, Fundació Miró, Barcelona
- 2008 - Antoni Llena. Espai Guinovart, Agramunt
- 2007 - Món, Galeria ABA Art Contemporani
- 2006 - Viatge d'hivern, Galeria Toni Tàpies, Barcelona
- 2005 - La pintura como experiència, Muso Patio Herreriano, Valladolid i Museu d'Art Jaume Morera, Lleida
- 2003 - Sense penediment, Galeria Toni Tàpies, Barcelona
- 2002 - Preveure, anticipar, investigar, Galeria Palma XII, Vilafranca del Penedès (Barcelona)
- 2001 - Velletque videre, Galeria Toni Tàpies, Barcelona
- 2001 - Antoni Llena, Obra recent, Fundació Espai Guinovart, Agramunt
- 1999 - Fantasmes Públics i Privats, Galeria Toni Tàpies, Barcelona
- 1997 - Preposicions, Galeria Toni Tàpies, Barcelona
- 1994 - Antoni Llena, Espais d'Art Contemporani, Girona
- 1993 - Antoni Llena, Galeria Joan Prats, Barcelona
- 1991 - L'ansietat de les influències. Tàpies vist per Llena, Fundació Antoni Tàpies, Barcelona
- 1991 - Antoni Llena, Artgràfic, Barcelona
- 1989 - Antoni Llena, Fundació Joan Miró, Barcelona
- 1969 - Escultures de paper, Petite Galeria, Lleida
