= Sant Julià de Vilatorta =

- Municipality
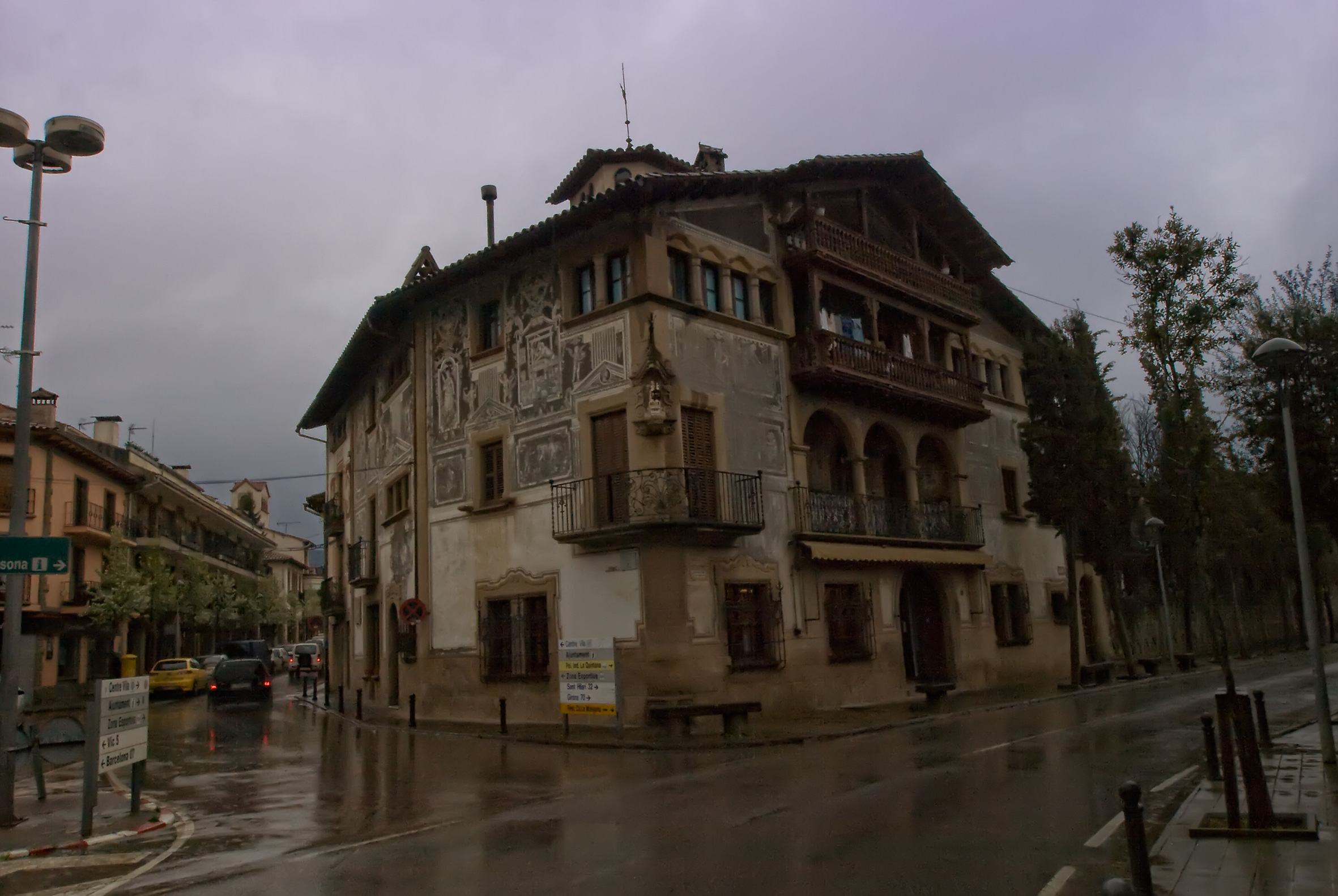
- El Casal Núria (1929)

- Flag Coat of arms

- Location in Catalonia
- Coordinates: 41.922°N 2.324°E
- Country: Spain
- Community: Catalonia
- Province: Barcelona
- Comarca: Osona

Government
  - Mayor: Joan Carles Rodríguez Casadevall (2015)

Area
  - Total: 15.9 km^{2} (6.1 sq mi)

Population (2025-01-01)
  - Total: 3,323
  - Density: 209/km^{2} (541/sq mi)
- Website: www.vilatorta.cat

Sant Julià de Vilatorta (Catalan pronunciation: [ˈsaɲ ʒuliˈa ðə βiləˈtɔɾtə]) is a municipality in the comarca of Osona in Catalonia, Spain.

== Paleontological and archeological sites ==
- Cánoves. Eocene paleontological site where a new echinoid species called Calzadaster Friasi was discovered and described in 2004. Nowadays we only know the holotipus preserved in the Museu de geología del seminari de Barcelona and two Paratypes in a private Collection in Amer village.
