= Espai Subirachs =

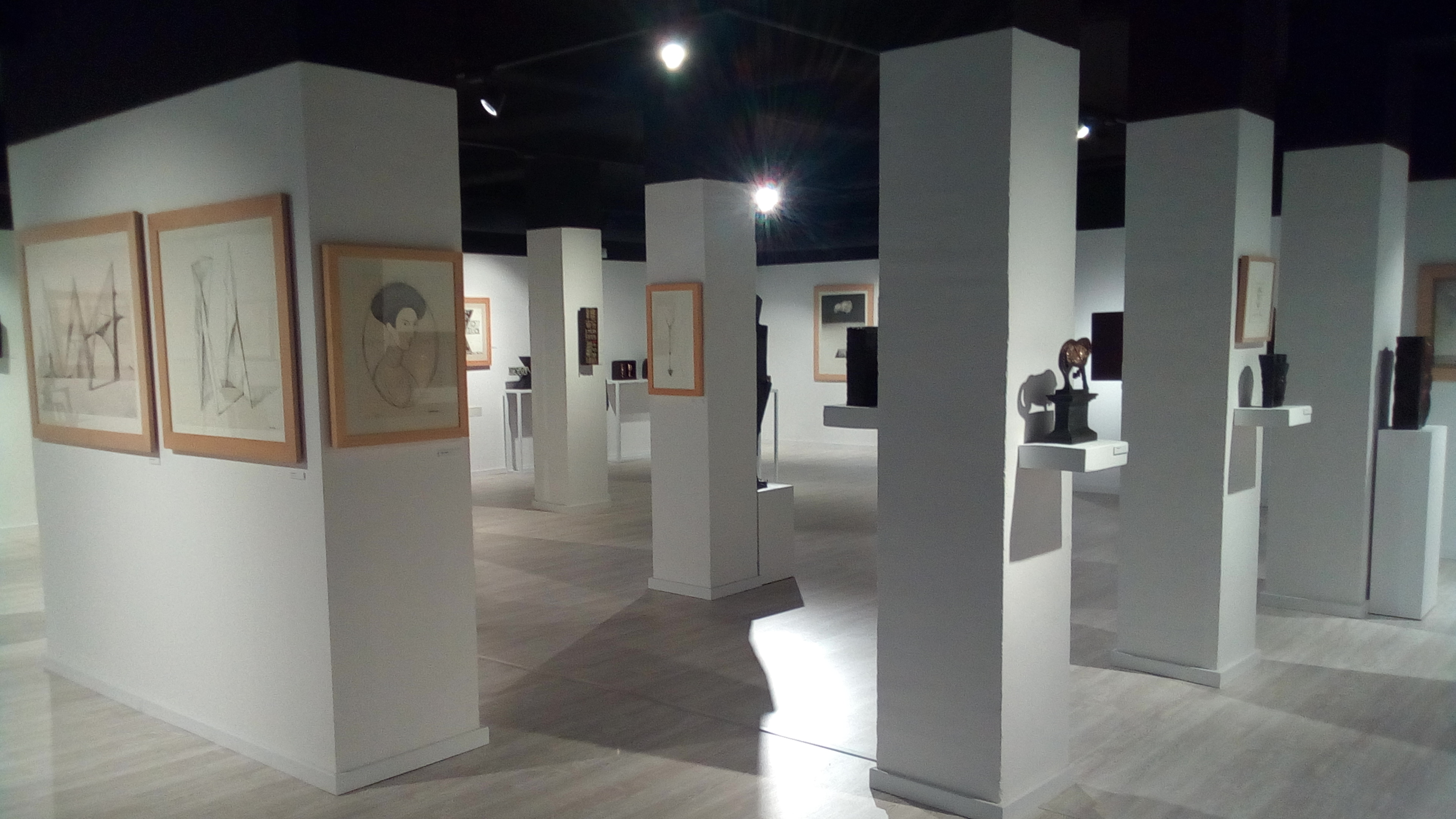
- Established: May 27, 2017
- Location: Poblenou, Barcelona, Spain
- Coordinates: 41.40412°N 2.19990°E
- Type: Art museum
- Collections: Works by Josep Maria Subirachs
- Website: http://www.subirachs.cat/

The Espai Subirachs (Spanish: Espacio Subirachs) is an art museum in Barcelona, Spain, dedicated to the works of artist Josep Maria Subirachs. It is located in a privately owned premises on Batista Street, in the neighborhood of El Poblenou (in the San Martí District). The museum opened on May 27, 2017.

== The artist ==
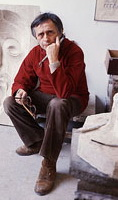
Subirachs photographed by Manel Armengol in his studio at Sagrada Familia (April 1987)

Josep Maria Subirachs (Barcelona, March 11, 1927- Barcelona, April 7, 2014) was a sculptor, painter, engraver, set designer, and art critic. He was one of the most renowned contemporary Spanish sculptors, as exhibited by the numerous awards and accolades he received, as well as the presence of his work in many museums and public spaces in cities worldwide, including Barcelona. He also participated in a large number of group and solo exhibitions, as well as public and private galleries.

== Museum ==
In 2001, Subirachs and the Caixa Penedès Foundation agreed to create a museum of his works at 21 Princesa Street in Barcelona, very close to the Museo Picasso. The project, designed by architects Ramón Sanabria and Lodia Planas, comprised 4,000 square meters distributed across two underground levels, a ground floor, and five upper floors. However, financial and administrative difficulties delayed the project, and it was effectively abandoned in 2012.
