= El Camp de l'Arpa del Clot =

Coordinates: 41°24′41.16″N 2°10′57″E

- Neighbourhood of Barcelona
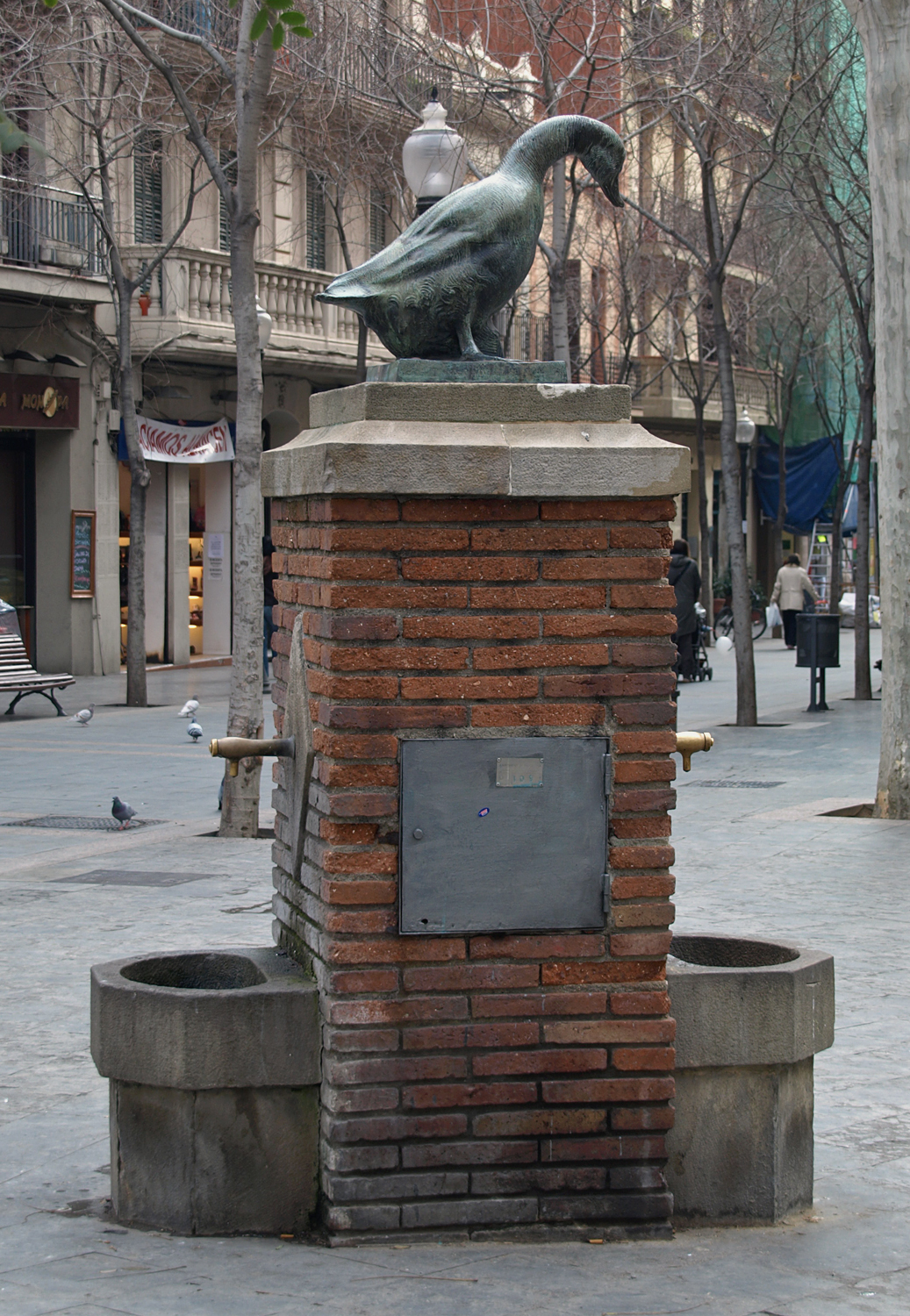
- Font de l'Ànec
- Interactive map of El Camp de l'Arpa del Clot
- Country: Spain
- Autonomous Community: Catalonia
- Province: Barcelona
- Comarca: Barcelonès
- Municipality: Barcelona
- District: Sant Martí

Area
  - Total: 0.742 km^{2} (0.286 sq mi)

Population
  - Total: 38,343
  - Density: 51,700/km^{2} (134,000/sq mi)

El Camp de l'Arpa del Clot (Catalan pronunciation: [ˈkam də ˈlarpə], name designated in 2006) is one of the ten neighborhoods of Barcelona which compose the district of Sant Martí, Catalonia (Spain). It was annexed by Barcelona in 1897. It is situated in the upper part of this district and before it was named Camp de l'Arca.

== Etymology ==
The name of Camp de l'Arpa is probably derived from the existence of a dolmen in this area. This dolmen was cited in a document of the year 1037 in an official document of Sant Cugat, with the Latin phrase "ad ipsa archa", in a dispute of the limits. The current name would be a linguistic deformation of the original.

== History ==
Camp de L'Arpa, a part of the original neighborhood of Muntanya (mountain in Catalan) of Sant Martí de Provençals, was started to be built in 1845 without being included later in Cerdà's urban plan. For that reason even today the conserved street structure is very different from the typical squared one of the near Eixample. During the 19th century both Camp de l'Arpa as well as El Clot saw the construction of the factories like flour mills, brick manufactories, textile industries and chemical industries, to name a few. At the end of 19th century the two neighborhoods had already strongly changed their appearance and lost a big part of their rural aspect, which characterized them earlier. They obtained in a few decades the aspect of an industrial center and worker housing due to considerable immigration from all parts of Catalonia and Aragon. It is in that time of big changes that the new social demands create a new vital network of associations which characterized El Clot and Camp de l'Arpa, with some of them still being active until now, such as Foment Martinenc, l'Orfeó Martinenc i la Formiga Martinenca.

Another important element of the history of El Clot and Camp de l'Arpa in the 19th century was the construction of the train track and the station of El Clot, today completely underground. During the 20th century, along the course of the old train track the Meridiana avenue was opened, which still divides the two neighborhoods. El Clot park is now where the former Clot Renfe station was. In the last time Camp de l'Arpa has changed a lot losing much of its industrial base and working class, converting itself in a residential area around the testimonies giving evidence of its past. Examples are buildings such as the old Escola d'Arts i Oficis which today hosts the secondary school called IES Zafra or the old factory Alchemika, which now accommodates a modern public library and as well apartment blocks, which imitate the elegant Eixample buildings and other smaller and more modest ones, which survive particularly in the smaller narrow streets (in Catalan, passatges) of Camp de l'Arpa, authentic parts of which have survived from the 19th into the 21st century, such as Andreví, Aloi, Constancia, Pisto, Puigmadrona, Sospir, all of them very close to Passeig Maragall.

== Geography ==
It is situated in the upper part of Sant Martí district, at the border of the area which Cerdà's Plan of 1859 wanted to develop. It is bordered by Avinguda Meridiana, Carrer d'Aragó, Dos de Maig street, Anthony Mary Claret street and Las Navas de Tolosa street. The Camp de l'Arpa neighborhood did not follow the Eixample plan of Ildefons Cerdà. As a result, the majority of the new streets do not follow the proposals of Cerdas' Plan when arriving in the neighborhood. For that reason the streets of Corcega, Rosello, Provença end at the crossing with Rogent street This duality is reflected by the types of buildings: on the one hand modest worker housing and on the other hand the typical housing model of the Eixample.
