= Jordi Ramisa =

Catalan architect, a sculptor and a drawing professor

Jordi Ramisa (born 6 October 1960) is a Catalan architect, a sculptor and a drawing professor.

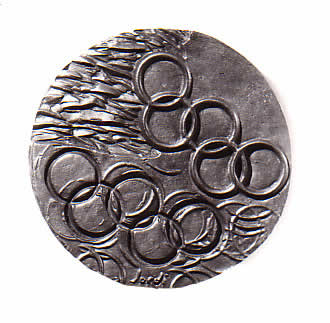
Olympic movement. Obverse. Cast Bronze. 180mm. Jordi Ramisa. 1992

Ramisa was born in Barcelona. In 1979 he obtained the Baccalauréat de l'Enseignement du Second Degré by the Academy of Toulouse and the Paul Sabatier University. He is a graduate of the Escola Tècnica Superior d'Arquitectura de Barcelona (School of Architecture of Barcelona) ( Universitat Politècnica de Catalunya), 1994. He is co-author, along with the sculptor Josep Ramisa, of the obverses of fifteen Barcelona 1992 Olympic Official Commemorative Medals. He has exhibited a medal called Olympic movement in the British Museum in the exhibition in the Round organized by the FIDEM (Fédération Internationale de la Médaille d'Art – International Art Medal Federation) in 1992.

== Exhibitions ==
- Museum and Study Center of Sport Doctor Melcior Colet, Barcelona.
- Olympic and Sports Museum Joan Antoni Samaranch (numismatic section in the center).
- In the Round: Contemporary art medals of the world, an exhibition held at the British Museum, London, 11 September – 25 October 1992.
- Mostra d'Arts plàstiques d'Arquitectes'97. Col·legi d'Arquitectes de Catalunya. Barcelona, 3–18 April 1997.
