= Subirachs =

Subirachs may refer to:

- 134124 Subirachs (2005 AM), a main-belt Asteroid discovered in 2005
- Josep Maria Subirachs (1927–2014), Catalan sculptor and painter of the late 20th century
