= El Parc i la Llacuna del Poblenou =

Coordinates: 41°23′57″N 2°11′27″E

El Parc I la Llacuna del Poblenou
- Neighbourhood of Barcelona
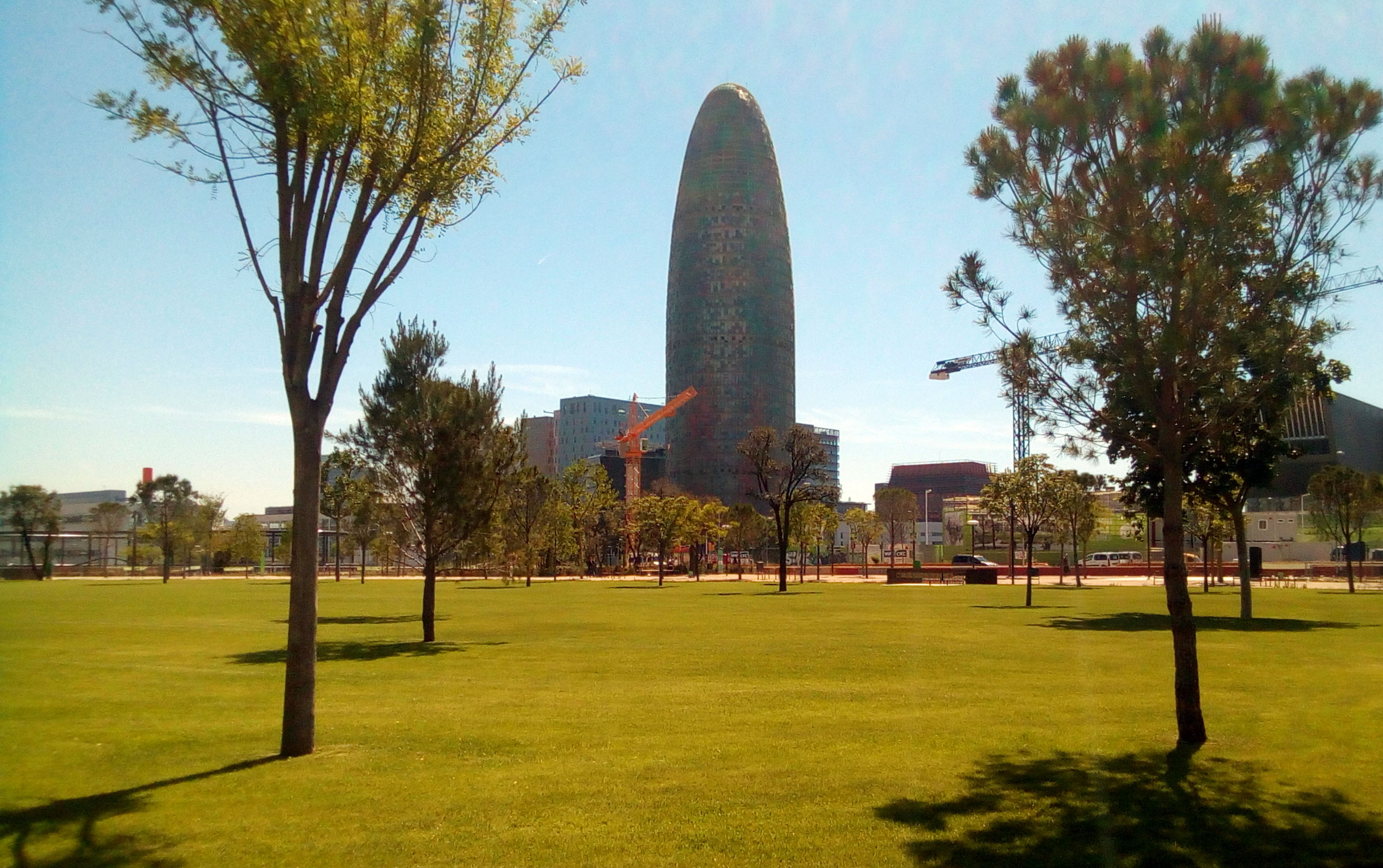
- Plaça de les Glòries Catalanes
- Interactive map of El Parc I la Llacuna del Poblenou
- Country: Spain
- Autonomous Community: Catalonia
- Province: Barcelona
- Comarca: Barcelonès
- Municipality: Barcelona
- District: Sant Martí

Area
  - Total: 1.114 km^{2} (0.430 sq mi)

Population
  - Total: 16,413
  - Density: 14,730/km^{2} (38,160/sq mi)

El Parc i Llacuna del Poblenou (Spanish pronunciation: [əl ˈpark i ʎəˈkunə ðəl ˌpɔbːləˈnɔw]) is a neighborhood in the Sant Martí district of Barcelona, Catalonia (Spain). The cores from this area were established around several parks (Parc de l'Estació del Nord, Parc de la Ciutadella), and the road that connected with el Clot, el Poblenou and la Llacuna. Previously, the nearest park was known as Fort Pius (some entities of the region retain this reference), which extended also to some islands that are in the neighborhood of la Vila Olímpica del Poblenou.
