= Centre de Cultura Contemporània de Barcelona =

Cultural center in Barcelona

Coordinates: 41°23′01″N 2°10′00″E

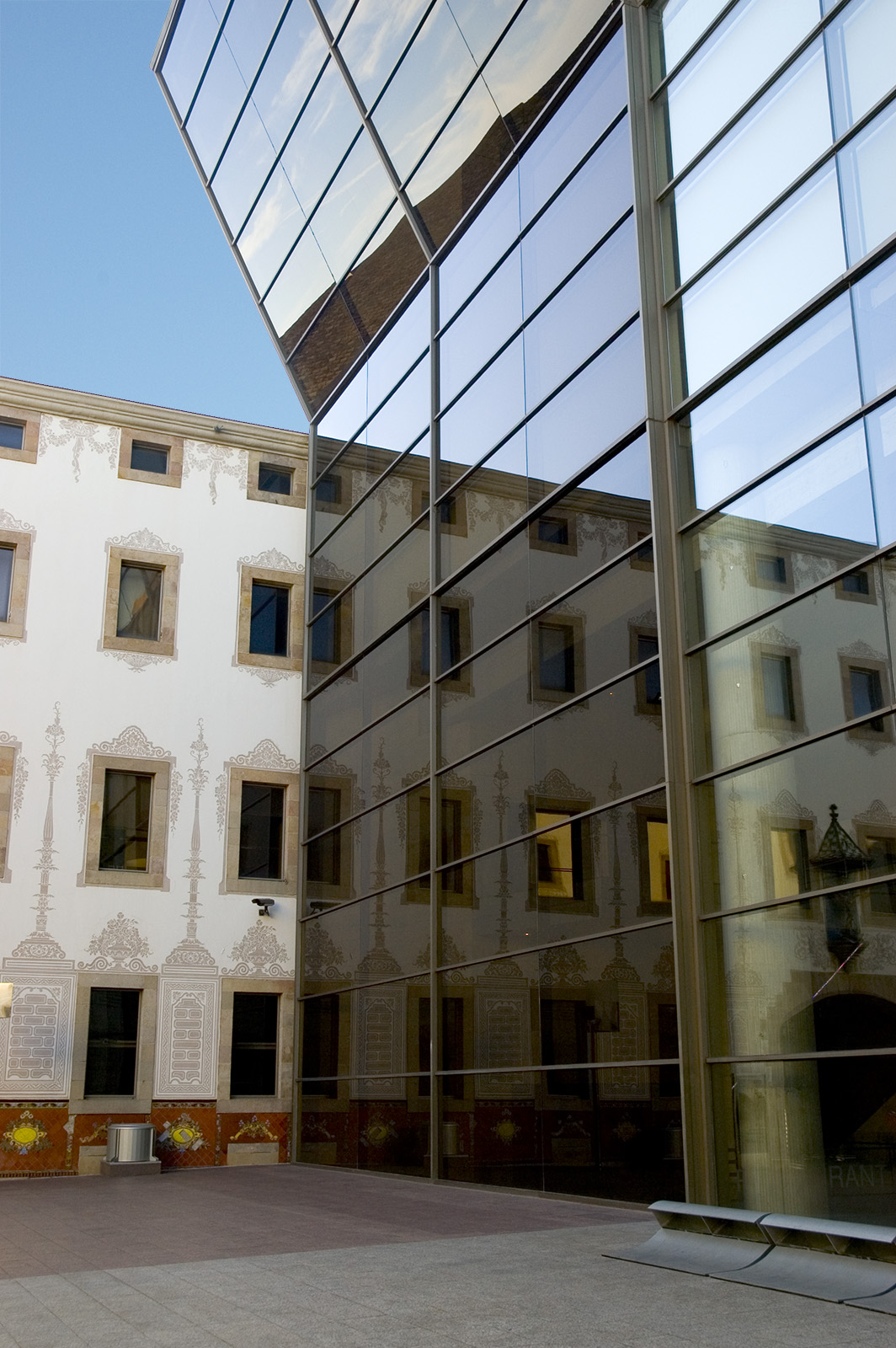
The CCCB in 2007

The Centre de Cultura Contemporània de Barcelona (also known by its acronym, CCCB) is an arts centre in Barcelona, Catalonia, Spain.

Situated in the Raval district, the centre's core theme is the city and urban culture. The CCCB organizes exhibitions, debates, festivals and concerts, film cycles, courses, lectures, and other activities.

== Activities ==
Situated in the Raval district, the centre's core theme is the city and urban culture. The CCCB organizes exhibitions, debates, festivals and concerts, film cycles, courses, lectures, and other activities; encourages creation using new technologies and languages, explores and promotes the ongoing fusion of languages and different genres, and takes in-house productions to other national and international arts centres, museums and institutions. The underlying aim of these activities is to generate debate, thinking and reflection on the theme of the city and public space, and other issues that define current affairs. It addresses issues with the aim of linking the academic world with creative processes and citizens in general. The CCCB is also an open space for creators, associations and freelance programmers with whom it has forged links over the years.

The CCCB offers the public access to part of its holdings, a multimedia archive comprising materials created by the centre during its years of activity. A wide variety of materials (documents, publications, digital files, audiovisuals, etc.) on key themes of contemporary culture and society are available for consultation in the CCCB Archive, which is constantly updated. Also open to the public is the centre's XcèntricArchive, a digital archive of experimental and documentary film, comprising over 700 titles related to its program “Xcèntric. The CCCB’s Cinema”.

The CCCB is a public consortium created by the Diputació de Barcelona (Barcelona Provincial Council) and Barcelona City Council. The management body governing the consortium is the General Council, whose president is the President of the Diputació de Barcelona and whose vice-president is the city's mayor. Judit Carrera is the director general.

== The building ==
The centre has a floor area of 15,000 m^{2}, of which 4,000 are exhibition spaces. It also has an auditorium, a bookstore and various multiuse seminar and lecture rooms. The CCCB occupies part of the old Casa de Caritat almshouse, built in 1802 and serving this role until 1957. The remodelled premises are the work of the architects Helio Piñón and Albert Viaplana, and, in 1993, the project was awarded the FAD and Ciutat de Barcelona Architecture Prizes. The new project replaced the north wing, completing the original U-shaped layout with a 30-metre-high prismatic volume, presenting a spectacular glazed façade that projects into the courtyard at the top. With its interplay of reflections, this new feature becomes a mirror of the surrounding rooftops and a prime lookout point over the city, as well as housing internal communications (halls, lifts and stairs).

In the spring of 2011, the CCCB expanded its premises with the incorporation of the former theatre of the Casa de Caritat, which has recently been remodelled. The project, designed by Martinez Lapeña-Torres Arquitectos, SL, forms a basement-level connection with the current premises, in the Pati de les Dones courtyard, and addresses the old theatre, built in 1912 by the architect Josep Goday i Casals, and part of one of the 19th-century cloisters of the former Hospital de la Caritat.

== See also ==
- List of museums in Barcelona
