= Provençals del Poblenou =

Coordinates: 41.4094°N 2.20056°E

- Neighbourhood of Barcelona
- Interactive map of Provençals del Poblenou
- Country: Spain
- Autonomous Community: Catalonia
- Province: Barcelona
- Comarca: Barcelonès
- Municipality: Barcelona
- District: Sant Martí

Area
  - Total: 1.105 km^{2} (0.427 sq mi)

Population
  - Total: 21,273
  - Density: 19,250/km^{2} (49,860/sq mi)

Provençals del Poblenou (Catalan pronunciation: [pɾuβənˈsalz dəl ˌpɔbːləˈnɔw]) is a neighborhood in the Sant Martí district of Barcelona, Catalonia (Spain).
