= Barcelona 1992 Olympic Official Commemorative Medals =

The Barcelona 1992 Olympic Official Commemorative Medals Set is a numismatic collection composed of 16 medals, commemorating the 1992 Summer Olympics that held in Barcelona. They share a common reverse designed by Josep Maria Trias (the logo designer) with the logo of the games, and 16 different patterns on the obverse. The number 16 was chosen because the Games lasted sixteen days.

On 9 December 1988, the CEO of the Barcelona Olympic Games Barcelona'92Josep Miquel Abad, and the manager of the company Argentfí SA (a Barcelona-based Company that ceased trading in 2001) Josefa Martínez Ortega, signed a contract under which the COOB'92 (Organizing Committee of Olympic Games Barcelona '92) granted the concession to that company for the manufacture, transmission and marketing of the series of official commemorative medals of the Games of XXV Summer Olympics.

On 12 December 1988, in the Museu i Centre d'Estudis de l'Esport Doctor Melcior Colet of the Generalitat of Catalonia has been presented the first medal of the series in which the logo Barcelona '92 appeared on the reverse and mascot Cobi designed by Javier Mariscal on the obverse. Emissions have continued with fifteen more obverses created by Josep Ramisa and Jordi Ramisa, with the most important monuments of Barcelona and the city itself. The complete collection of 16 medals was presented again in Museu i Centre d'Estudis de l'Esport Doctor Melcior Colet on 13 December 1991.

The medals was produced with the following specifications, alloys and weights:

- 1000/1000 Fine Silver, 40 mm diameter.
- 22 karat gold 917/1000, 26 mm diameter, 8.5 gr.
- 22 karat gold 917/1000, 32 mm diameter, 17.5 gr.

== Exhibitions ==
- Olympic and Sports Museum Joan Antoni Samaranch (numismatic section in the center).
- Museu i Centre d'Estudis de l'Esport Doctor Melcior Colet, Barcelona.
