= Centre d'Art Santa Mònica =

Cultural property in Barcelona, Spain

Coordinates: 41°22′38″N 2°10′34″E

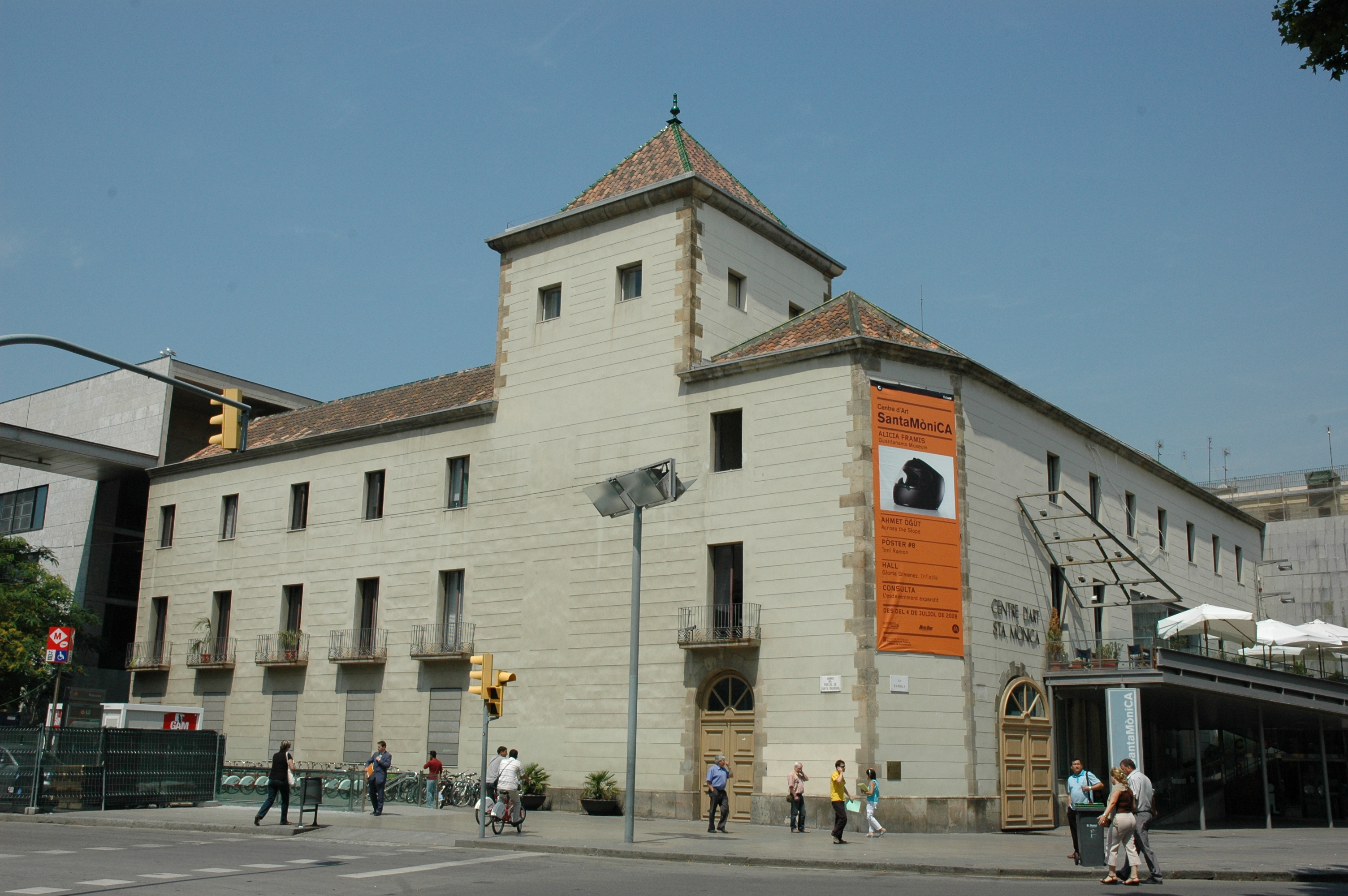
The building as seen from the seafront.

Centre d'Arts Santa Mònica (CASM), more commonly abbreviated as Arts Santa Mònica, is a public venue in Barcelona, (Catalonia) opened in 1988, for exhibiting contemporary art. It is located in the Raval side of Rambla de Santa Mònica (Ciutat Vella district). It hosts a number of exhibitions of contemporary Spanish and international artists every year. Entrance is free.

The building that hosts CASM is a 1626 Renaissance convent that became a monument of national interest in 1984. In 2021, Enric Puig Punyet was installed as the Centre d'Art Santa Mónica director.

In 2024, an installation, "Teló", installed sun loungers on the terrace of the Centre d'Art Santa Mónica creating a refuge for visitors.

== See also ==
- List of museums in Barcelona
