= El Besòs i el Maresme =

Coordinates: 41°25′11.86″N 2°12′58.13″E

- Neighbourhood of Barcelona
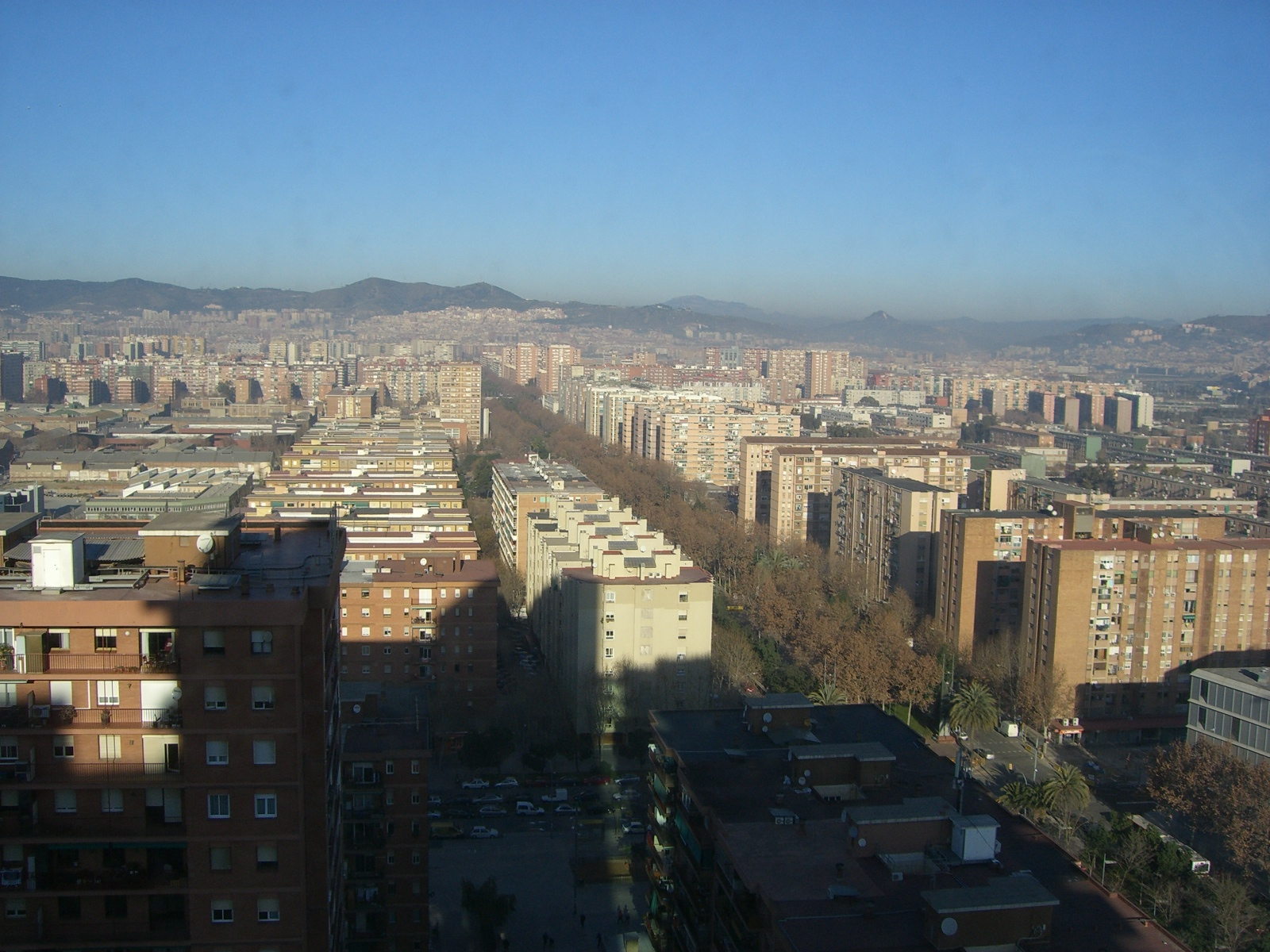
- El Besòs i el Maresme, with Rambla de Prim at the centre
- Interactive map of El Besòs i el Maresme
- Country: Spain
- Autonomous Community: Catalonia
- Province: Barcelona
- Comarca: Barcelonès
- Municipality: Barcelona
- District: Sant Martí

Area
  - Total: 1.274 km^{2} (0.492 sq mi)

Population
  - Total: 27,892
  - Density: 21,890/km^{2} (56,700/sq mi)

El Besòs i el Maresme (Catalan pronunciation: [əl βəˈzɔz jəl məˈɾɛzmə]) is a neighborhood in the Sant Martí district of Barcelona, Catalonia (Spain). Originally the land had been irrigated by the irrigation of the burrow and the Verneda, remains of an old arm of the river Besòs that empties into the Camp de la Bóta. The neighborhood stretches along the Rambla de Prim.

In the neighborhood there is part of the Parc del Fòrum, built for the event of 2004 Universal Forum of Cultures and there will be built the campus Diagonal-Besòs and Zoo Marine.
