= Museum of the History of Catalonia =

Coordinates: 41.380900°N 2.185693°E

- Museu d'Història de Catalunya (MHC)

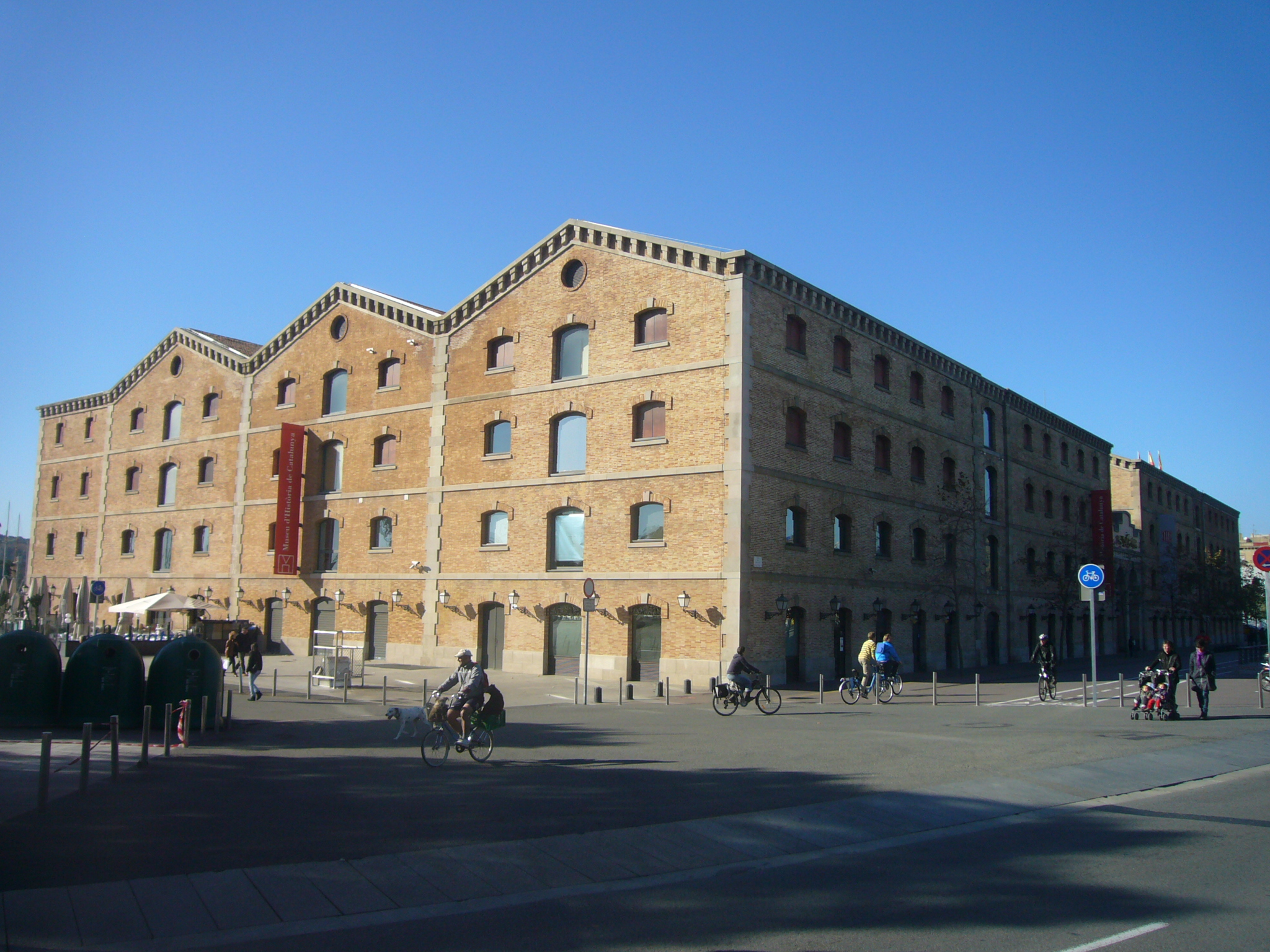
- Established: February 1996; 30 years ago
- Location: Palau de Mar, Plaça de Pau Vila, 3, Barcelona
- Type: History museum
- Visitors: 47.934 (2021); 35.134 (2020); 147.565 (2019)
- Director: Jordi Principal
- Owner: Generalitat de Catalunya
- Public transit access: Barceloneta
- Website: www.mhcat.cat

The Museum of the History of Catalonia (Catalan: Museu d'Història de Catalunya, MHC) is a history museum in Barcelona that promotes the awareness and knowledge of the history of Catalonia and its culture. The museum is located in Barcelona's Palau de Mar, the former General Stores (Magatzems Generals de Comerç), the sole building of Barcelona's old industrial port still standing.

== Exhibitions ==
The permanent exhibition "The memory of a country" consists of a journey through the history of Catalonia from prehistoric to contemporary times, documenting the main events, cultures and historic personalities that made up the history of Catalonia. It is divided on 8 historical periods and it develops on the second and third floor of the museum building. At the first floor, instead, temporary exhibitions are showcased, for example: "Fashion and fashion designers" (2019), "Beyond the trenches (1936-1939): Photographies by Alec Wainman" (2019) and "Viladecans Cartells" (2024).

The museum website offers free of charge online audio guides for the exhibitions in different languages: Catalan, Spanish, English and French.

== Management ==
It is controlled and funded by the Government of Catalonia through the Ministry of Culture. It is one of the 11 museums that are a member of the Network of History Museums and Monuments of Catalonia Network (XMHCat). Since 1997, the museum building also holds the Center for Contemporary History of Catalonia and its library, which is administered by the Ministry of the Presidency.

=== Directors ===
1. Carme Laura Gil i Miró (1996)
2. Josep Maria Solé i Sabaté (1996-2000)
3. Jaume Sobrequés i Callicó (2000-2008)
4. Agustí Alcoberro i Pericay (2008-2014)
5. Jusèp Boya i Busquet (2014-2016)
6. Margarida Sala i Albareda (2016-2023)
7. Jordi Principal (2023-present)
