= Egyptian Museum of Barcelona =

Archaeological museum in Barcelona, Spain

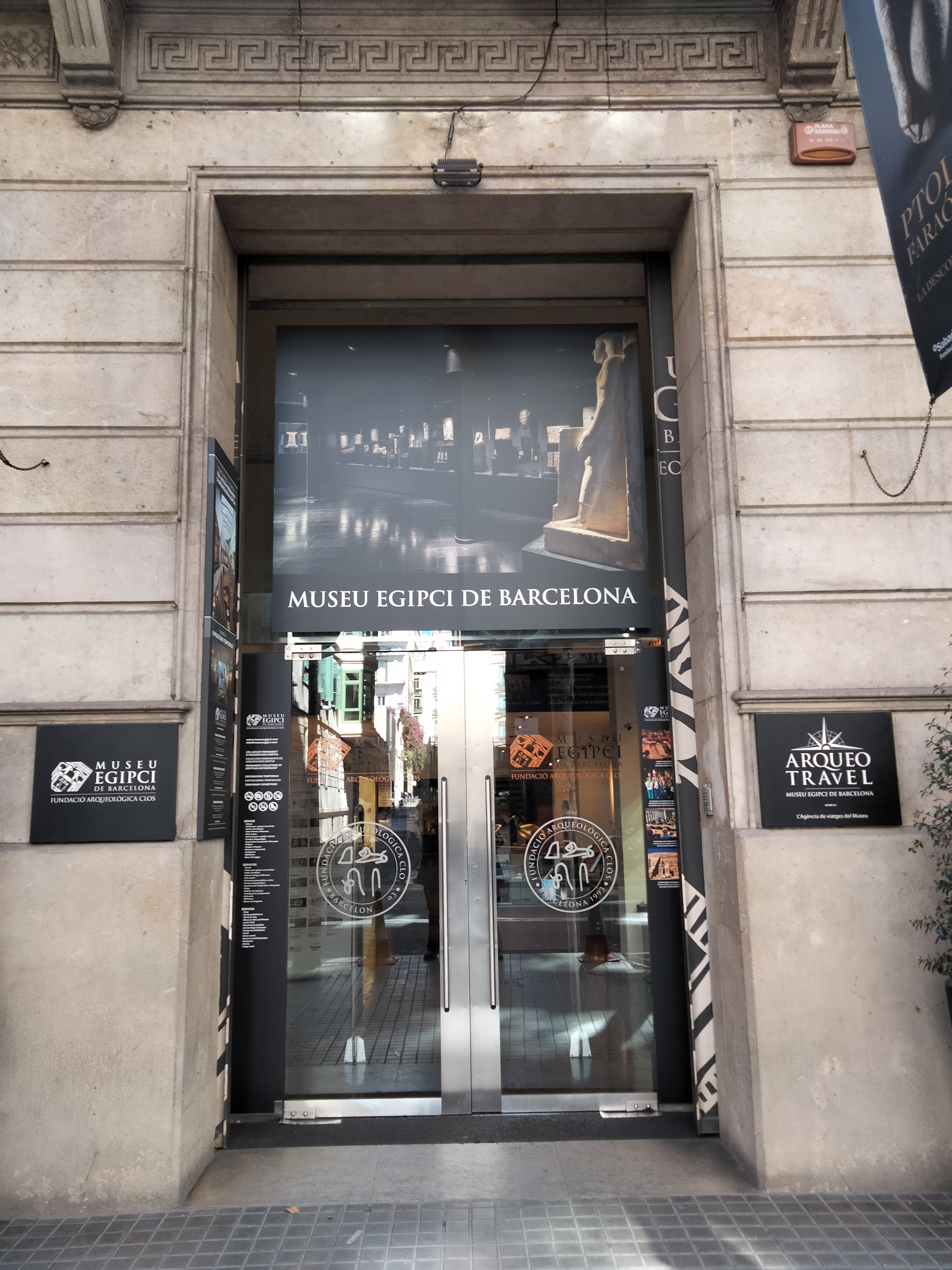
- Museum entrance
- Established: 23 March 1994
- Location: Valencia, 284; Barcelona, Spain
- Coordinates: 41.3937°N 2.1665°E
- Collection size: 1,260
- Website: www.museuegipci.com/en/

The Egyptian Museum of Barcelona (Catalan: Museu Egipci de Barcelona) is a private museum of Egyptian archaeology in Barcelona, Spain. The museum has a permanent collection consisting of more than 1,200 works from Ancient Egypt. It is managed by the Clos Archaeological Foundation, a non-profit organization founded in 1992.

The museum consists of three floors, two of which contain the permanent collection and one that contains temporary exhibitions.

The museum received 257,273 visitors in 2023.

== Gallery ==
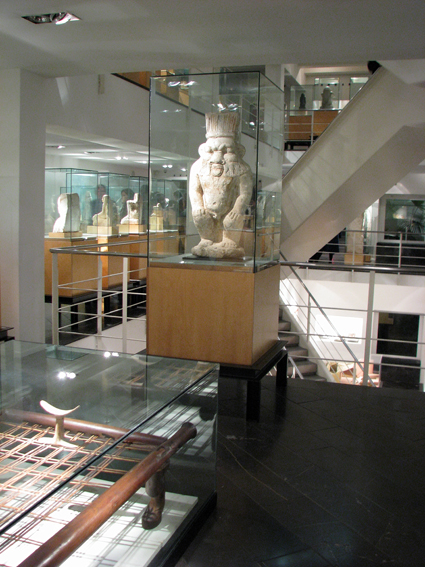
First floor
