= Museu Geològic del Seminari de Barcelona =

Geological museum in Barcelona, Spain

Geological Museum of the Barcelona Seminary
- Museu Geològic del Seminari de Barcelona
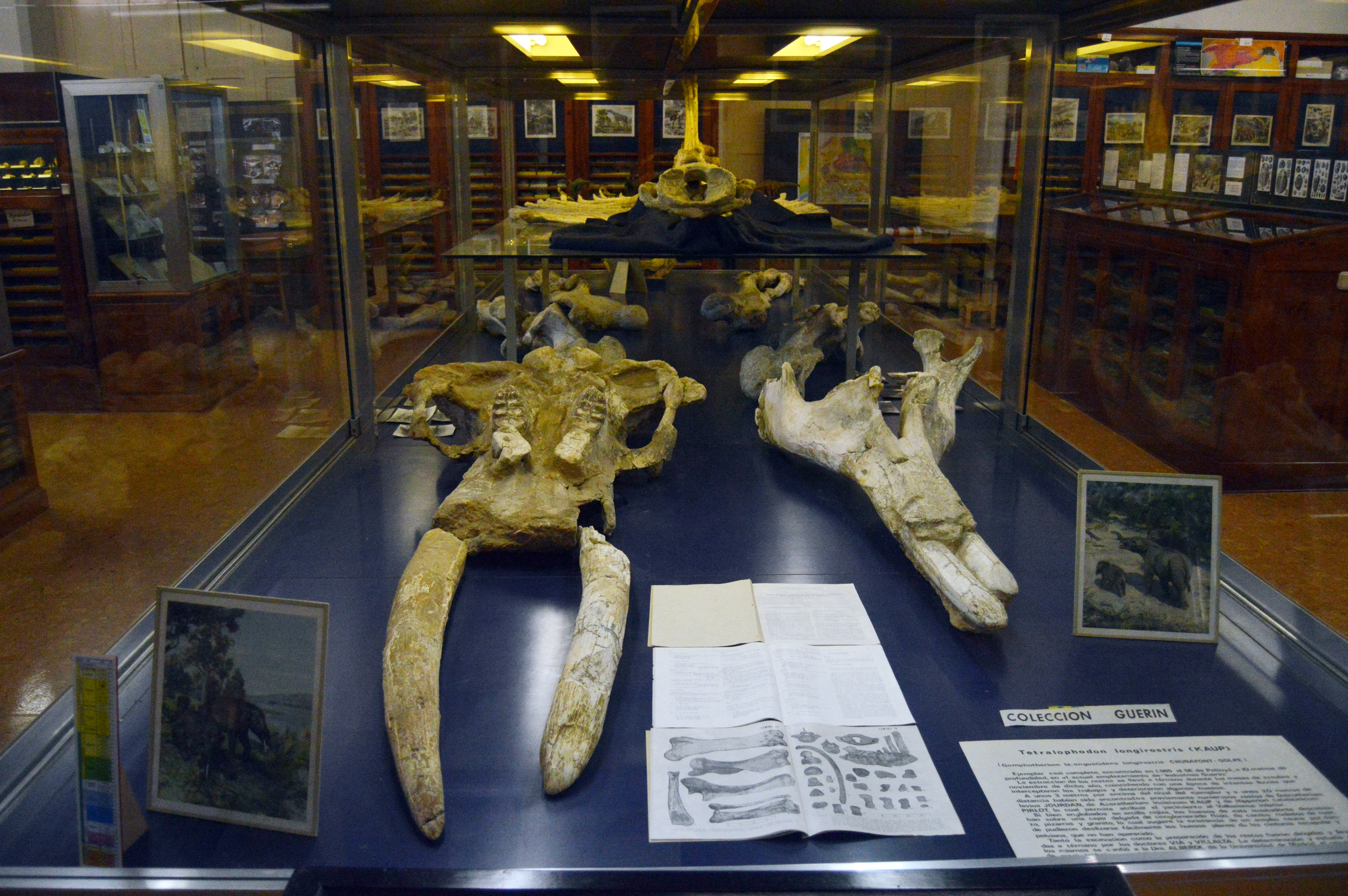
- Interior view of the Geological Museum of the Barcelona Seminary

- Location of the Geological Museum of the Barcelona Seminary
- Established: 1874
- Location: Carrer de la Diputació, 231,Barcelona, Spain
- Coordinates: 41.388069°N 2.163097°E
- Type: Natural history museum
- Collection size: 90,000
- Director: Sebastià Calzada i Badia
- Website: https://www.mgsb.es/

The Geological Museum of the Barcelona Seminary (Catalan: Museu Geològic del Seminari de Barcelona, MGSB) is a natural history museum situated inside the Barcelona Conciliar Seminary in Barcelona. The museum was established in 1874 and works to promote the study and better understanding of paleontology. The Museu Geològic del Seminari de Barcelona specialization is fossilised invertebrates from different geological periods.

== History ==
Before the existence of the Geological Museum of the Barcelona Seminary, there was the Barcelona Natural History Cabinet of curiosities in 1817. The present museum was founded in 1874 by Jaume Almera i Comas (1845-1919), the first museum director and depended on the Barcelona Seminary Seminari Conciliar de Barcelona. Since 1885, the museum manufactures geological maps of the Province of Barcelona.

Since 1988, the museum has edited the Batalleria magazine (about every annual studies) and Scripta Musei Geologici Seminarii Barcinonensis magazine. In 1994, the Museum Friends Association (l'associació Amics del Museu Geològic del Seminari de Barcelona/AMGS) was created to collaborate in studies and promote the museum.

The museum has two halls: the exhibition hall and a new area opened in 2000, called "Sala Cardenal Carles," created for younger visitors. This area is necessary because is more didactic and its possible to see recreation figures, taxidermy, fossils or illustrations.

== Collection ==
The museum's collection holds more than 86,576 fossil taxa (December 2020), a library with more than 17,000 books, a laboratory, and historical archive. The institution has a large collection of fossil malacology, corals, sponges, brachiopods, trilobites, and others. There is a large display case with a complete Tetralophodon in the main exhibition hall.

The Geological Museum of the Barcelona Seminary contains over 700 fossil holotypes.

== See also ==
- List of museums in Barcelona
