= Cornellà de Llobregat =

Cornellà de Llobregat: Cornellá de Llobregat (Spanish)
- Municipality
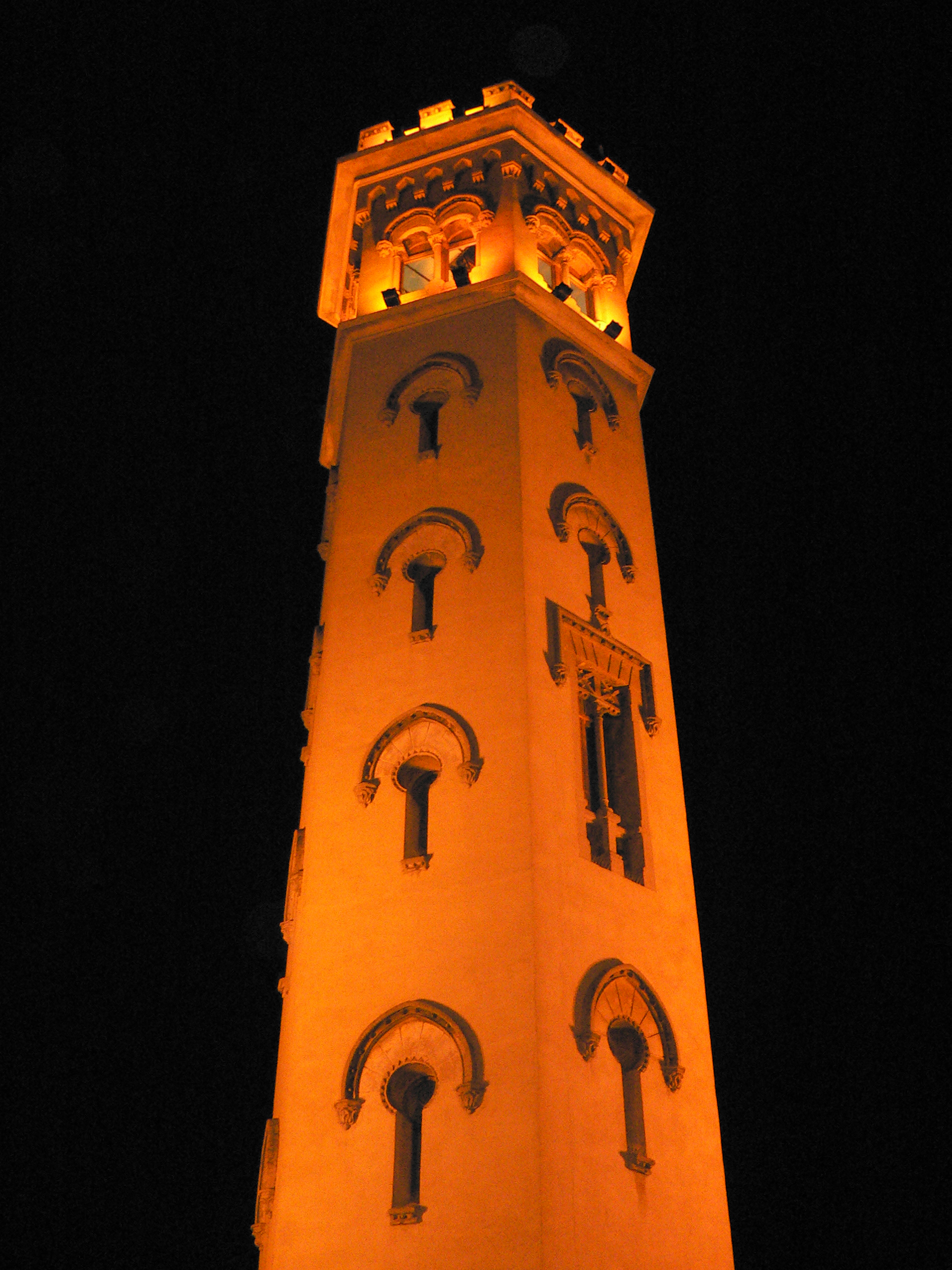

- Flag Coat of arms

- Location in Catalonia Cornellà de Llobregat (Spain)
- Coordinates: 41°21′18″N 2°04′16″E
- Country: Spain
- Community: Catalonia
- Province: Barcelona
- Comarca: Baix Llobregat

Government
  - Mayor: Antoni Balmón Arévalo (2015) (PSC)

Area
  - Total: 7.0 km^{2} (2.7 sq mi)
- Elevation: 27 m (89 ft)

Population (2025-01-01)
  - Total: 92,237
  - Density: 13,000/km^{2} (34,000/sq mi)
- Website: cornella.cat

Cornellà de Llobregat (Catalan pronunciation: [kuɾnəˈʎa ðə ʎuβɾəˈɣat]; Spanish: Cornellá de Llobregat, Spanish pronunciation: [koɾneˈʎa ðe ʎoβɾeˈɣat]) is a municipality in the comarca of the Baix Llobregat in Catalonia, Spain. It is situated on the left bank of the Llobregat River. It is in the south-western part of the Barcelona metropolitan area and is part of the wider urban area. It is home to RCD Espanyol and UE Cornellà.

== History ==
The history of Cornellà de Llobregat is defined by three principal factors: its proximity to the city of Barcelona, its being an area of passage (as was the entire Comarca of Baix Llobregat) to and from the capital of Catalonia, and the presence of the Llobregat River. Its name is of Roman origin (Cornelianus) and the city's architectural characteristics possess Visigoth traits.

The first written reference to the city dates from 980 AD, at which time a church and a defense tower to ward off the Saracens already existed in the same place as the current castle (constructed in the fourteenth century). The city was incorporated into Barcelona's territory in the thirteenth century and, for a short time, belonged to the "Franqueses del Llobregat" in which agricultural activity was principally developed.

== 2017 Controversy ==
Cornellà de Llobregat was subject of a controversy in November 2017 as a result of an opinion piece published in Catalan newspaper El Nacional, in which the inhabitants of Cornellà were accused of being "settlers" by virtue of their immigrant (Xarnego) origin and alleged refusal to integrate or learn the Catalan language. The article claimed that the working-class "red-circle" of Barcelona, of which Cornellà de Llobregat is an example, is a bastion of Spanish nationalism where "Catalans" are stigmatized.

== Demography ==
1900	1930	1950	1970	1986	2018
2197	7031	11,473	77,314	86,928	87,173

== Notable people ==
Actors

- Adrián Rodríguez
- Marina Salas

Recording artists

- Chicuelo
- Estopa
- Levi Díaz, winner of La Voz Kids 2021

Radio and television hosts

- Tony Aguilar
- Jordi Évole, host of Salvados

Sportspeople

- Reyes Estévez
- Rubén Miño
- Paula Nicart
- Daniel Solsona

== Institutions ==
- Citilab is a laboratory for citizen innovation based in Cornellà. It is located in the former Can Suris factory building.
- The Museum of Mathematics of Catalonia is an interactive math museum located in the district.
