= Museum of Mathematics of Catalonia =

Coordinates: 41°21′27″N 2°05′06″E

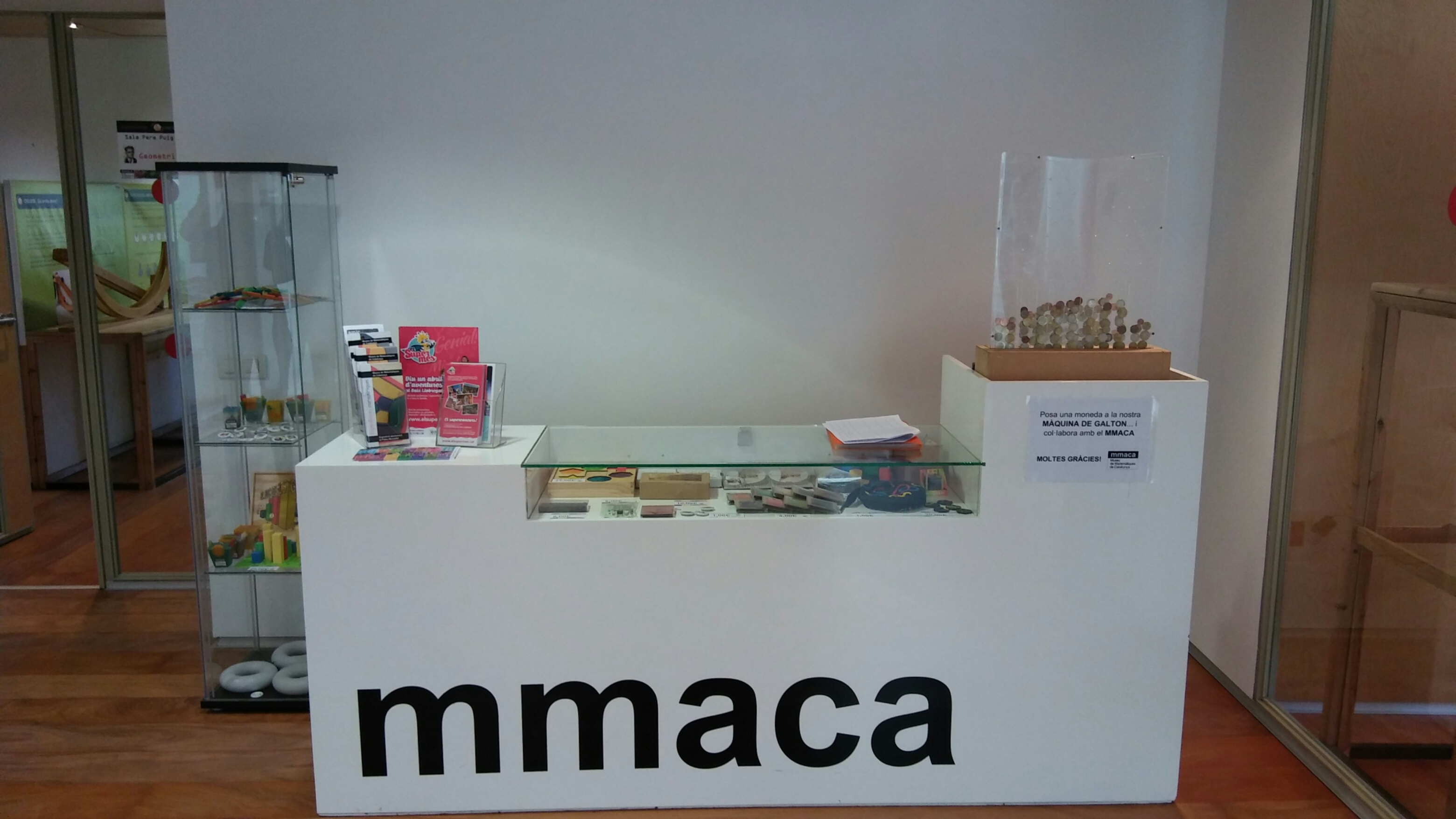
- Entrance
- Established: 2014
- Location: Carretera de l'Hospitalet, s/n, Palau Mercader, 08940 Cornellà de Llobregat
- Website: mmaca.cat

The Museum of Mathematics of Catalonia (Catalan: Museu de Matemàtiques de Catalunya, MMACA) is a mathematics museum located about 10 km southwest of central Barcelona, in the Cornellà de Llobregat municipality in the province of Barcelona, within the autonomous community of Catalonia, Spain.

== History ==
The Museum of Mathematics of Catalonia was founded in 2014 as a place to host exhibitions and activities where mathematics is approached from a practical and playful point of view.

In February 2023, it was announced that the museum would eventually move from its current location in the Mercader Palace Museum to a former warehouse at Can Bagaria in Cornellà.

== Exhibits ==
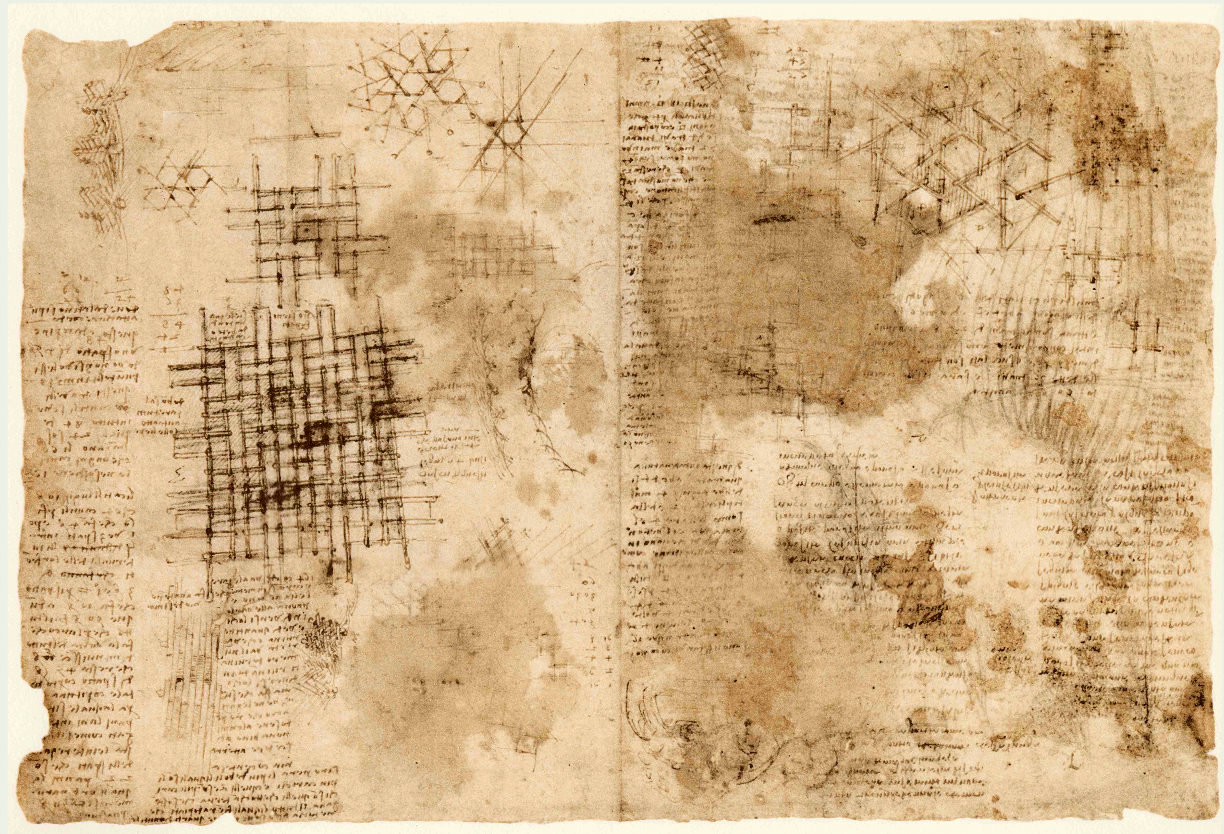
Exhibit: Leonardo da Vinci's Codex Atlanticus depicts a structure of interconnected beams. This mathematical arrangement makes it possible to cover a large span with much smaller supporting elements.

The exhibition at the MMACA is made up of more than 100 modules in continuous renewal. They touch on multiple themes including plane and 3-dimensional geometry, games, puzzles, statistics, probability, mathematics and art, number theory, history of mathematics, optical illusions and fractals.

The various rooms of the Cornellà exhibition are named after mathematicians, popularizers, and educators. Examples include Eratosthenes, Pere Puig Adam, Emma Castelnuovo, Martin Gardner, George Pólya, Luis Santaló and Maria Montessori. The playful motto of the MMACA is "Not touching is Prohibited," indicating that visitors are encouraged to play and experiment with everything that is on display.

== Outreach ==
One of the goals of MMACA is to create a network of permanent exhibitions in different cities of Catalonia. To this end, in February 2025, a new permanent branch was opened in Tarragona.
