= Museu Tàpies =

Cultural center and museum in Barcelona, Spain

Tàpies Museum
- Museu Tàpies
- Established: 1984
- Location: Barcelona, Spain
- Coordinates: 41°23′30″N 2°9′49″E
- Type: art museum
- Visitors: 65,000 (2024)
- Founder: Antoni Tàpies
- Curator: Manuel Borja-Villel (2024)
- Public transit access: Passeig de Gràcia (L2, L3, L4), Barcelona Metro
- Website: Official website

The Tàpies Museum (Catalan: Museu Tàpies) is an art museum and cultural centre in Barcelona, Catalonia. It is dedicated mainly to the life and work of the painter Antoni Tàpies, who himself founded the museum in 1984 under the name Fundació Antoni Tàpies to promote the study and knowledge of contemporary art. It is located in the former headquarters of the Montaner and Simon Publishing House at 255 Carrer d'Aragó.

The museum's collection has a large body of work by Tàpies, including those donated by the painter himself and by Teresa Tàpies. In addition to permanent exhibitions dedicated to the Barcelona-born painter, the museum organizes numerous temporary exhibitions.

== History ==
The Fundació opened in June 1990 in the building of the former Montaner i Simon publishing house, a work of the architect Lluís Domènech i Montaner, restored and refurbished by the architects Roser Amadó i Cercós and Lluís Domènech Girbau. Constructed between 1880 and 1885, at an early stage of the evolution of Catalan Modernisme style, the building was the first in the Eixample district to integrate industrial typology, combining exposed brick and iron.

== See also ==
- List of museums in Barcelona
