= Vicenç de Roca i Pi =

Spanish businessperson (1780-1852)

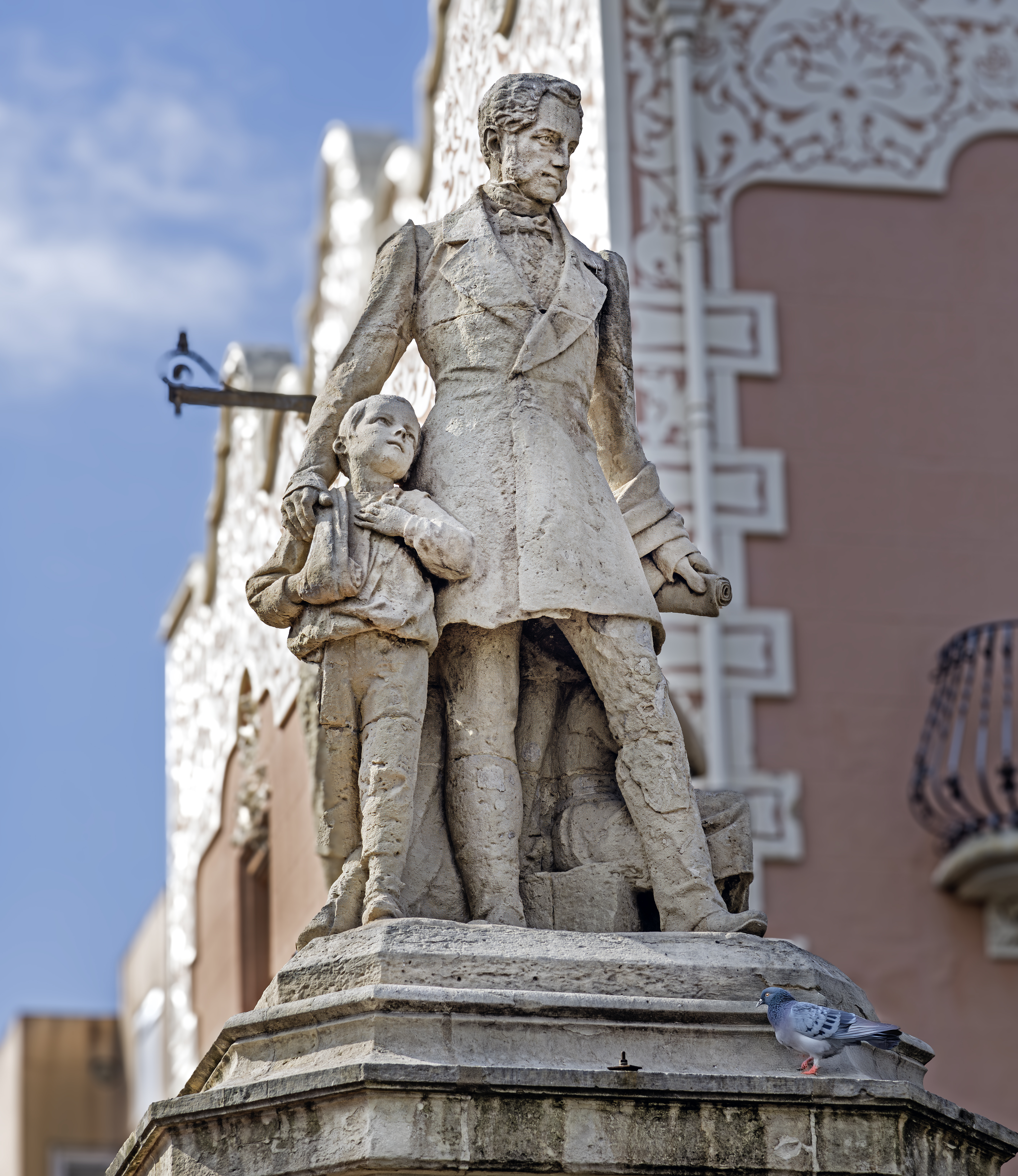
Statue to Roca i Pi in the Rambla of Badalona

Vicenç de Paül Elies de Roca i Pi, baron of Marmellar (18 July 1780 – 9 July 1852) was a Spanish businessman and philanthropist who made his fortune trading with America. By the end of his life he retired to live in Badalona where he practised charity.

He was born in a well-being family in Barcelona. His parents were the businessman Joaquim Roca and Raimunda Pi who had 5 children including Vicenç. He studied humanities with the Piarists and was taught in the family business by his father, which consisted in American maritime trade. When he assumed the control of the businesses, he became successful and gained the respect of many merchants.

At the death of his parents, he established his home in Fontana (Gràcia), where he lived with his brother and sister Joaquim and Raimunda. He also got married but his wife died childless and he never get married again. In 1835 he decided to retire to live in Badalona with his brother and sister and there started doing charities for the poor, helpless and sick people. From 1846 he gradually fell ill and died because of a stroke in 1852. He was buried in the cemetery of Sant Gervasi de Cassoles.

Roca i Pi is known especially for the legacy he left in his will for his brother and sister. As he and the rest of his direct relatives had no children he decided to bequeath his fortune and properties to the poor living in Badalona after the death of Joaquim and Raimunda. However, a relative of them contested the will, for that started a court trial that lasted 9 years. Many personalities from Badalona made campaign in favour of the will of Roca i Pi. Finally in 1886, the Supreme Court ratified the will. In Badalona it was constituted a charity institution to manage the fortune and properties of Roca i Pi and that was based after some time in the old factory of Can Gusi. The institution still exists today as a foundation.

Roca i Pi was widely honoured in Badalona. On 15 August 1894 a monument was dedicated to him in the Rambla, designed by the Joan Baptista Pons and sculpted by Torquat Tasso. Removed during the Spanish Civil War and replaced afterwards near its original location, currently the sculpture is one of the most known landmarks of the street.

On 6 June 2020 his remains were transferred to old cemetery of Badalona at a request of Foundation Roca i Pi.

== Bibliography ==
- Abras, Margarida; Carreras, Montserrat; Nieto, Maria Dolors (2003). Tots els carrers de Badalona (PDF). Badalona: Museum of Badalona. ISBN 84-88758-14-6. Archived from the original (PDF) on 11 April 2022.
- Codina, Gaspar (1980). "A en Vicenç de Roca i Pi". Amistat. Butlletí del Museu Municipal. Badalona: Museum of Badalona. p. 8.
- Codina, Gaspar (1981). "Biografies dels germans de don Vicenç, don Joaquim i donya Raimunda". Amistat. Butlletí del Museu Municipal. Badalona: Museum of Badalona. p. 6.
- Cuyàs Tolosa, Josep Maria (1982). Història de Badalona. Badalona: Arts Gràfiques Duran. ISBN 84-400-8651-2.
- Rosés Castellsagués, Sílvia (2007). "El monument a Vicenç de Roca i Pi". Carrer dels Arbres. Revista anuari del Museu de Badalona.
- Sadurní Puigbò, Núria (2005). L'Abans. Recull gràfic de Badalona (1888-1965). El Papiol: Editorial Efadós. ISBN 84-95550-45-8.
- Villarroya Font, Joan (Dir.) (1999). Història de Badalona. Badalona: Museum of Badalona. ISBN 84-88758-03-0.
