= Palau Robert =

Building in Barcelona, Spain

Coordinates: 41.396185°N 2.15937°E

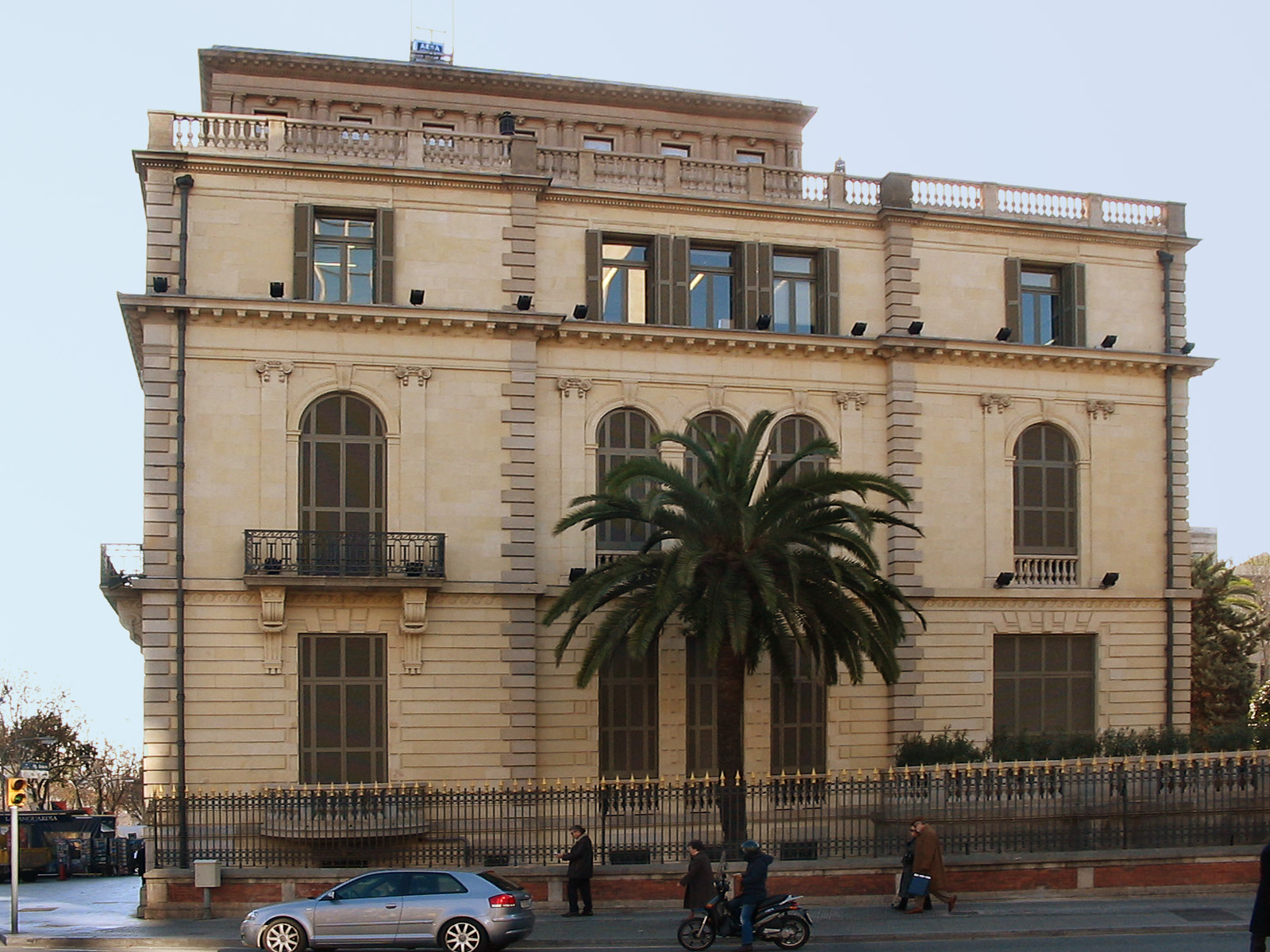
Avinguda Diagonal façade of Palau Robert.

Palau Robert (Catalan pronunciation: [pəˈlaw ruˈβɛɾt]) is a building on Barcelona's Passeig de Gràcia 107, the former private residence of Robert Robert i Surís, an influential aristocrat, politician and businessman at the turn of the 20th century. It's now a government-run institution that hosts an exhibition centre with three halls, a concert hall and gardens as well as the Information Tourist Centre for Catalonia. In the 1936–1939 period, it was the site of the Generalitat de Catalunya's Ministry of Culture. After the Spanish Civil War, Robert's family regained the Palau, until its second purchase by the Generalitat de Catalunya (the Catalan government) in 1981, when it became a public building.

== Building ==
An example of late neoclassical style, made of stone from Montgrí, the Palau Robert was finished in 1903 under the direction of architects Henry Grandpierre and Joan Martorell i Montells. The garden was designed by Ramon Oliva, who also designed Plaça Catalunya. Its palm trees were brought during the 1888 Barcelona Universal Exposition.

== Transport ==
The nearest Barcelona Metro station is Diagonal, and the FGC station Provença, on lines L3, L5, L6, L7, S1, S2, S5 and S55. The station's exit is adjacent to the Palau Robert. Bus lines stopping nearby are: 6, 7, 15, 16, 17, 22, 24, 28, 33 and 34.

== See also ==
- List of museums in Barcelona
- List of theatres and concert halls in Barcelona
