= El Clot =

Coordinates: 41°24′38.2″N 2°10′58.86″E

- Neighbourhood of Barcelona
- Interactive map of El Clot
- Country: Spain
- Autonomous Community: Catalonia
- Province: Barcelona
- Comarca: Barcelonès
- Municipality: Barcelona
- District: Sant Martí

Area
  - Total: 0.696 km^{2} (0.269 sq mi)

Population
  - Total: 26,928
  - Density: 38,700/km^{2} (100,000/sq mi)
- Demonym(s): clotenc, -a

El Clot (Catalan pronunciation: [əl ˈklɔt], Spanish: [el ˈklot]) is a neighborhood in the Sant Martí district of Barcelona, Catalonia (Spain). It is one of the oldest parts of the district that has been around since the medieval times under the name Clotum Melis (Clot de la Mel). It was one of the parts of the former municipality of Sant Martí de Provençals, as were the current neighborhoods of el Poblenou and Sant Martí de Provençals.
