= Museum and Study Center of Sport Doctor Melcior Colet =

Sports museum in Barcelona, Spain

Coordinates: 41°23′35.29″N 2°8′54.0″E

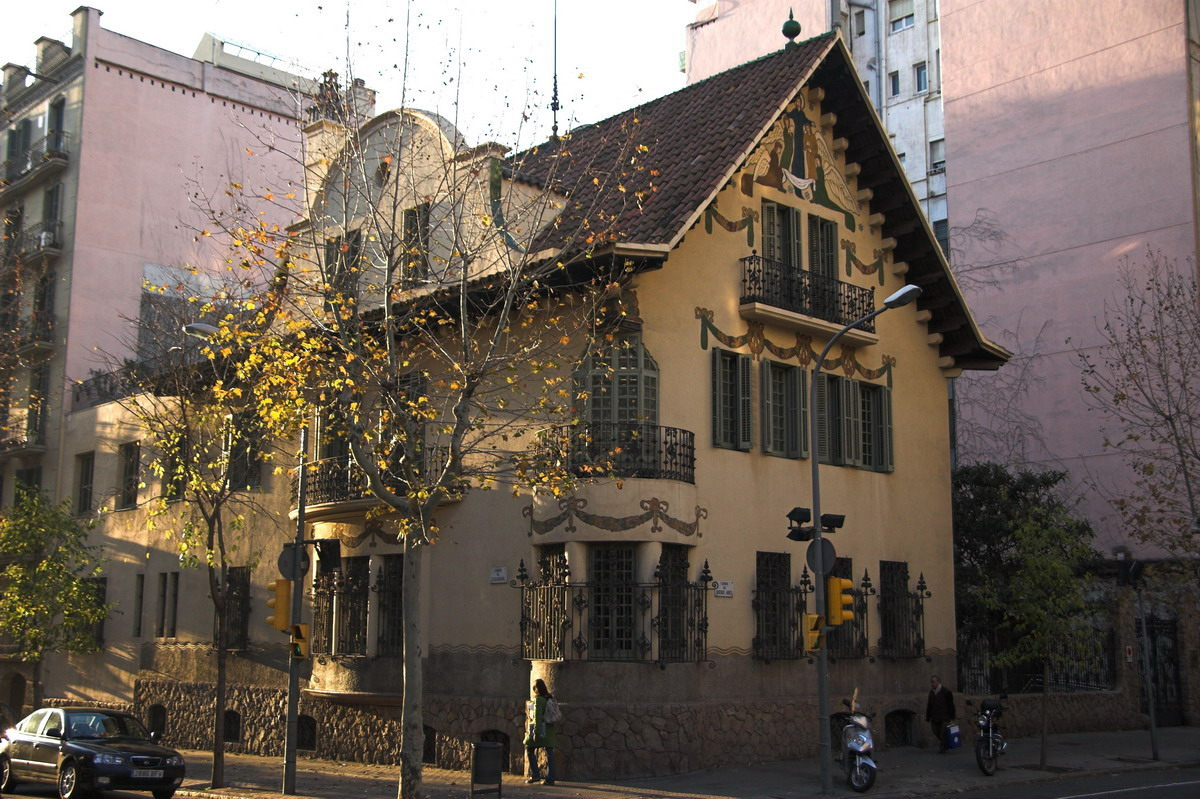
Casa Pere Company (Barcelona).

The Museum and Study Center of Sport Doctor Melcior Colet (in Catalan, Museu i Centre d'Estudis de l'Esport Doctor Melcior Colet) is a facility dedicated to the promotion and exhibition of the most prominent in the development of the history of the sport in Catalonia in recent centuries. It is based in an Art Nouveau house built in 1911 by Josep Puig i Cadafalch the Casa Pere Company, which is located in Buenos Aires street, 56, Barcelona .

In 1982, Dr. Melcior Colet i Torrabadella gave the building to Generalitat of Catalonia to transform it into a museum.

On 13 December 1991 it introduced the Barcelona 1992 Olympic Official Commemorative Medals.
