= Sant Martí (district) =

- District of Barcelona
- Location of Sant Martí within Barcelona
- Country: Spain
- Autonomous Community: Catalonia
- Province: Barcelona
- Comarca: Barcelonès
- Municipality: Barcelona
- Neighbourhoods: El Besòs i el Maresme, El Camp de l'Arpa del Clot, El Clot, Diagonal Mar i Front Marítim del Poblenou, El Parc i Llacuna del Poblenou, El Poblenou, Provençals del Poblenou, Sant Martí de Provençals, La Verneda i la Pau, La Vila Olímpica del Poblenou

Area
  - Total: 10.8 km^{2} (4.2 sq mi)

Population (2005)
  - Total: 221,029
  - Density: 20,500/km^{2} (53,000/sq mi)

Sant Martí (Catalan pronunciation: [ˌsam məɾˈti], in Spanish: San Martín), is a district of Barcelona located on its eastern side, usually numbered 10 out of the ten districts of the city.

It borders the Mediterranean Sea, Sant Adrià del Besòs and four other districts of the city: Ciutat Vella, l'Eixample, Horta-Guinardó and Sant Andreu.

It did not become an integral part of Barcelona until as late as 1897, having been an autonomous village since 1714 with the imposition of the infamous Nueva Planta decrees. Before then, it had been a secondary parish of Santa Maria del Mar.

== Demographics ==
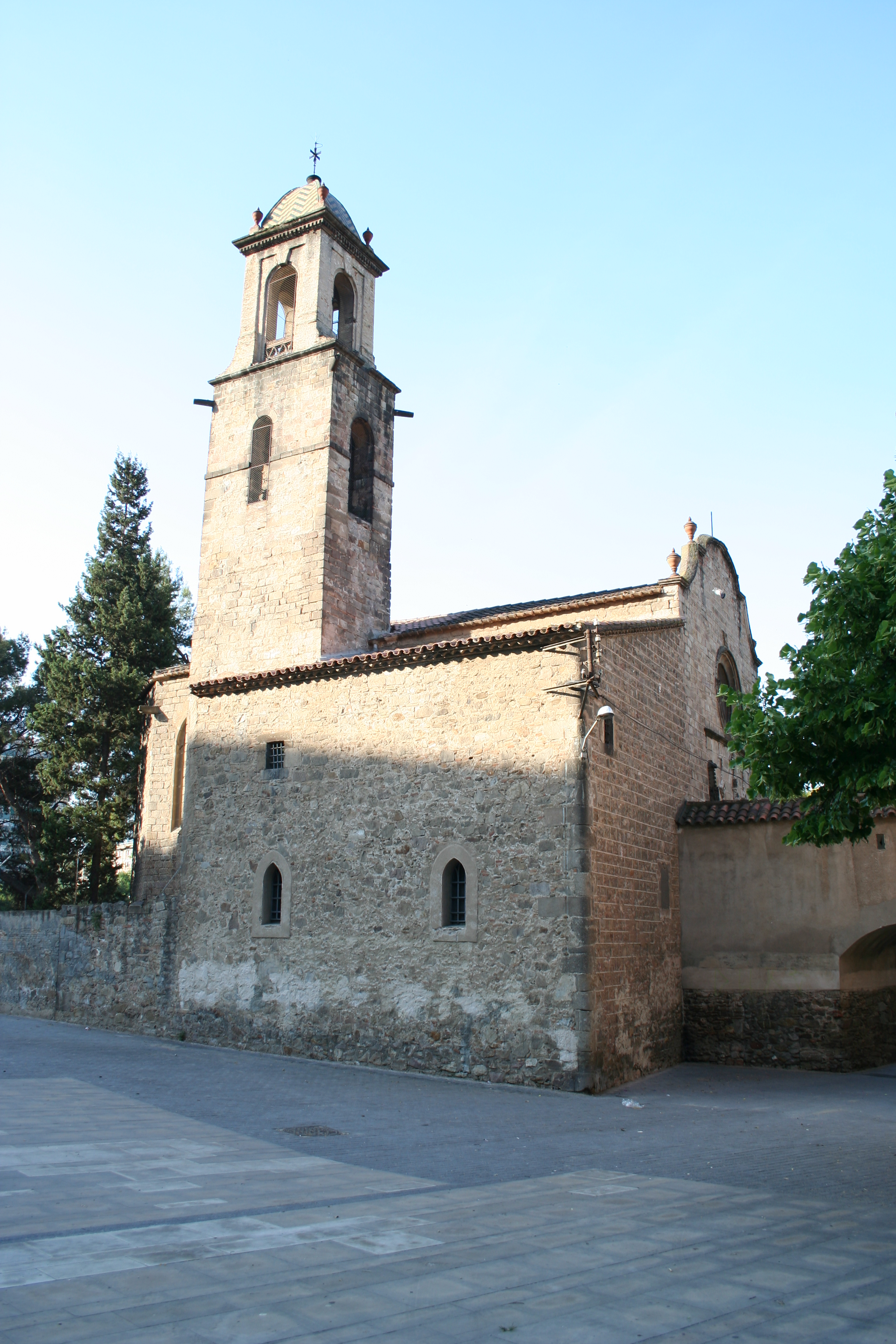
The district is named after Saint Martin church.

Sant Martí has a population of 221,029 (2005), which makes it the second most populated district in Barcelona. Being the fourth largest district (10,8 km^{2}), it is also the sixth in density (20.466 inhabitants/km^{2}).

== Neighbourhoods ==
The district is divided into the following neighbourhoods:

- El Besòs i el Maresme
- El Camp de l'Arpa del Clot
- El Clot
- Diagonal Mar i Front Marítim del Poblenou
- El Parc i Llacuna del Poblenou
- El Poblenou
- Provençals del Poblenou
- Sant Martí de Provençals
- La Verneda i la Pau
- La Vila Olímpica del Poblenou

== Etymology ==
It is possible to trace the origin of the name Provençals in the Latin word provincialis, a term used by the Romans to design fields just beyond the city walls. Also, Sant Martí is the name of the first church built in the area.

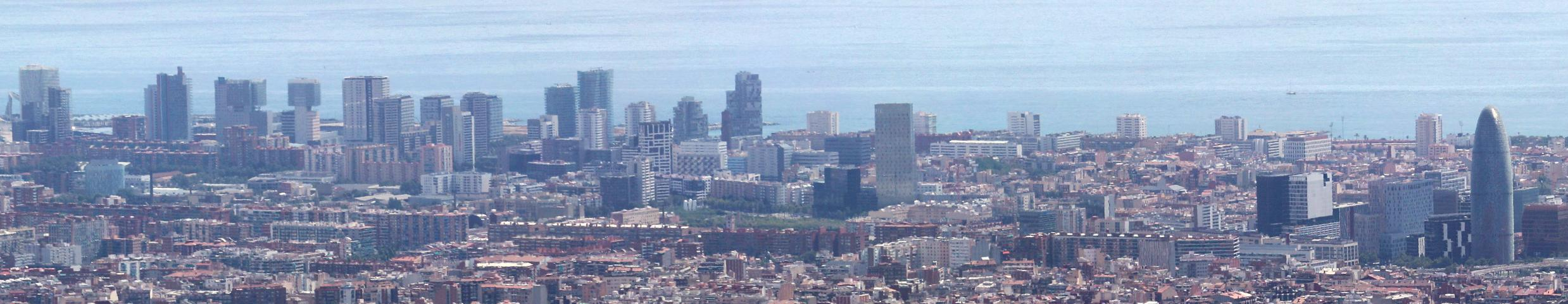
Barcelona Business Center in Diagonal Mar, Sant Martí district

== See also ==
- Street names in Barcelona
- Urban planning of Barcelona
