= Josep Maria Subirachs =

Spanish sculptor and painter (1927–2014)

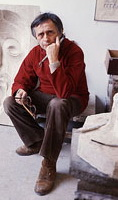
Josep Maria Subirachs.

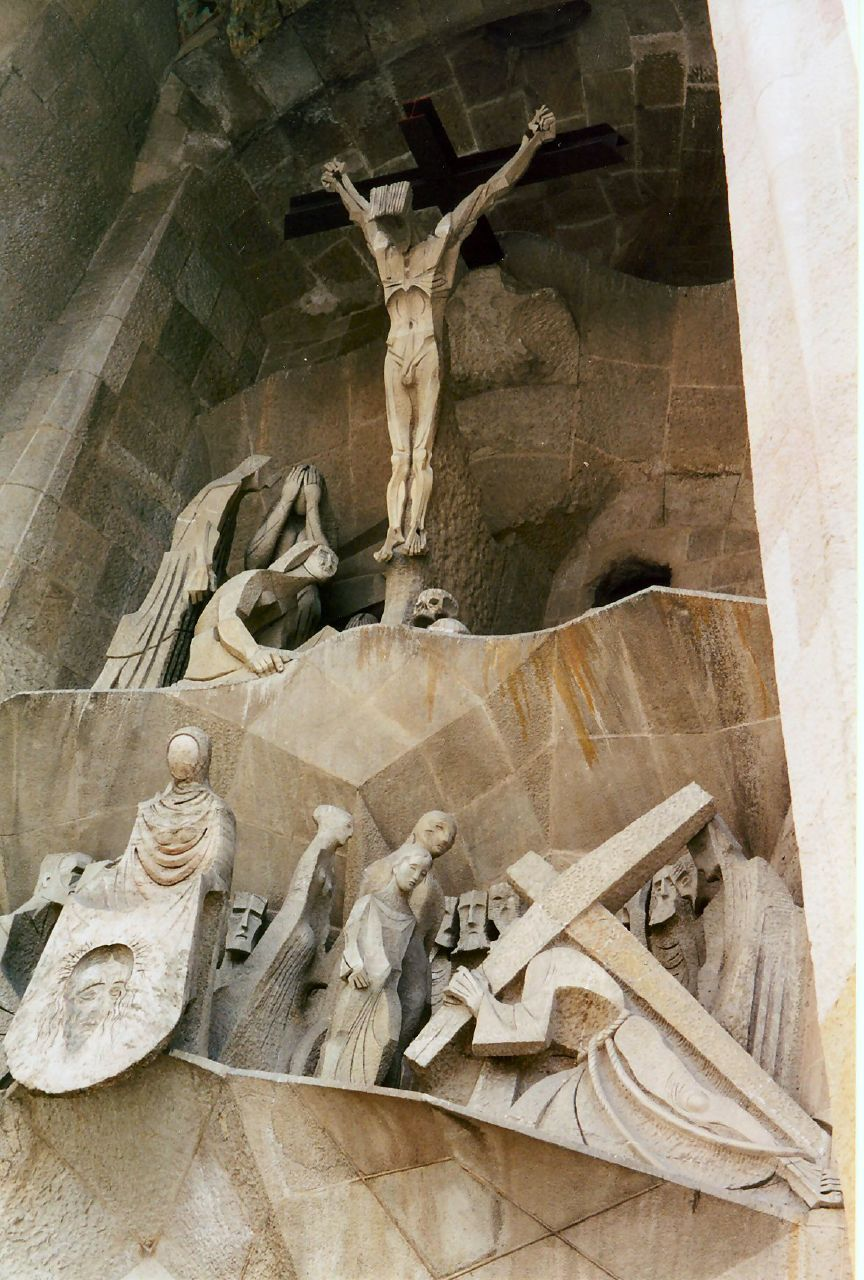
Passion Façade, Sagrada Família, Barcelona.

Josep Maria Subirachs i Sitjar (Catalan pronunciation: [ʒuˈzɛb məˈɾi.ə suβiˈɾaks]; 11 March 1927 – 7 April 2014) was a Spanish sculptor and painter of the late 20th century. His best known work is probably the Passion Facade of the basilica of the Sagrada Família in Barcelona. He was controversial, as he did not make any concessions to the style of the architect who designed the building, Antoni Gaudí.

Subirachs' sculptural typography in Barcelona is featured in Eye magazine (No. 37, Vol. 10, Autumn 2000) along with the work of Joan Brossa.

== Biography ==
Josep Maria Subirachs was born in the Barcelona neighborhood of Poblenou, the son of Josep Subirachs i Casanovas, a worker in a dye factory, and Josepa Sitjar i Ferrer. Coming from a humble family, he did not have the resources to dedicate himself to architecture, his greatest vocation from a young age, although as a sculptor he was very aware of the conjugation of his work within buildings or public spaces. Despite everything, his father encouraged his artistic streak, encouraging him in his drawings to capture different perspectives of reality, such as those made in negative or reverse, exercises that stimulate imagination and creativity.

At the age of fourteen he entered as an apprentice in a gilder's workshop, where he had his first contact with artisanal processes. He later worked in various jobs, as an apprentice decorator, retoucher in an image workshop, assistant to an antique dealer, mechanic, lamp base maker, and advertising illustrator. Between 1942 and 1947 he was a pupil of the sculptor Enric Monjo, while attending evening drawing classes at the Escola Superior de Belles Arts de Barcelona. In 1947 he entered the workshop of Enric Casanovas, who, despite his death a few months later, had a powerful influence on the young sculptor, introducing him to the Noucentista style then fashionable in the Catalan capital.

In 1948 he held his first solo exhibition at the Casa del Llibre in Barcelona, presenting ten sculptures and six drawings. The following year he participated in the October Salons in Barcelona, where he exhibited for several consecutive years, until 1957. In 1950, together with the sculptors Francesc Torres Monsó and Josep Martí Sabé, and the painters Esther Boix, Ricard Creus and Joaquim Datsira, he founded the Postectura group, which presented their manifesto and an exhibition at the Galeries Laietanes in Barcelona. This short-lived group declared itself the heir of Cubism and Purism and, according to Subirachs, "symbolizes the tendency towards humanization of current art, having as its master or precursor the elementary constructive style that characterizes one of the artistic currents of our time derived from Cézanne".

In 1951 he obtained a scholarship from the ca:Cercle Maillol of the ca:Institut Francès de Barcelona to study in Paris, where he came into contact with avant-garde artists and was influenced by the English sculptor Henry Moore. In 1953 he was part of the organizing committee of the Associació d'Artistes Actuals (AAA), together with Enric Planasdurà, Antoni Tàpies, Joan-Josep Tharrats, Joan Fluvià and Alexandre Cirici i Pellicer. Invited by the Belgian artist Luc Peire, he settled for a time in Belgium (1954–1956) where his international fame began. Here he received numerous commissions from the collector Rémy Vanhoidsenhoven. It was then that he began to consider dedicating himself professionally to sculpture.

In 1956 he began his collaboration with the advertising agency Zen, founded and directed by Francesca Granados and Alexandre Cirici, where he received numerous commissions from companies and entities throughout Catalonia. Much of Subirachs' work is placed in public spaces, accessible to everyone. This was his personal preference, stating that "art without a spectator has no reason to exist. Art should be for everyone and, therefore, it is best if it is placed in public spaces." In 1957 he received his first commission for a public work, Forma 212, located in the Llars Mundet in Barcelona, which he would claim was the first abstract artwork placed on a public street in Barcelona. This work was followed three years later by his work Evocació marinera, located in the Barceloneta neighborhood, which caused some controversy due to its abstract forms (whereas Forma 212 met little outcry as it was placed in the outskirts of the city). Later, between 1959 and 1961, he created the facade of the ca:Basílica de la Mare de Déu del Camí, and from then on he received numerous commissions for public places around the world.

In 1961 he began teaching at the ELISAVA in Barcelona. Politically committed, in 1966 he made the commemorative medal of the ca:Sindicat Democràtic d'Estudiants de la Universitat de Barcelona, the proceeds of which were used to pay the fines imposed on the participants in the closure of the Capuchin convent in Sarrià-Sant Gervasi, known as ca:La Caputxinada.

In 1980 he was elected academician of the sculpture section of the Reial Acadèmia Catalana de Belles Arts de Sant Jordi. He has also received, among other distinctions, the Gold Medal of Merit in the Fine Arts, Saint George's Cross, and the Gold Medal for Artistic Merit from the Barcelona City Council.

Josep Maria Subirachs died in Barcelona on 7 April 2014, at the age of 87. Suffering from Parkinson's disease, he had stopped working in 2010.

== Artistic works ==
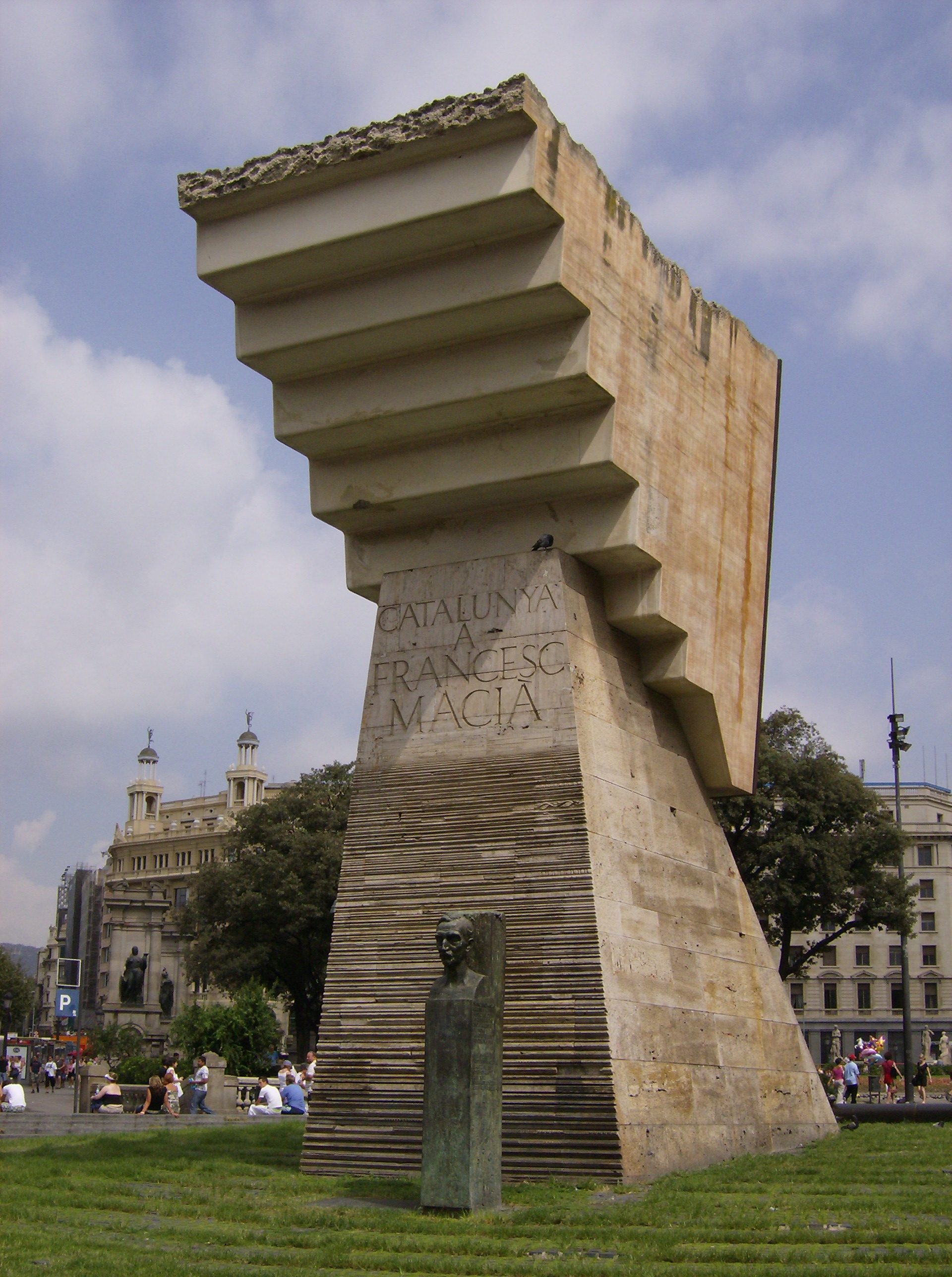
Monument to President Macià, Plaça Catalunya, Barcelona.

Subirachs showed talent as for art from a young age, and he is a painter, engraver, scenic designer, sculptor, lecturer, art critic and architect.

He worked in projects around the world, in different styles: Mediterranean style, Expressionism, Abstract art, new figuration.

Main works

- 1957: Forma 212. Sculpture in Jardins Mundet (Barcelona)
- 1960: Marine evocation ("Evocació marinera"). La Barceloneta (Barcelona).
- 1962: Saint Michael's cross. Santa Maria de Montserrat Abbey
- 1968: Monument to Mexico
- 1969: Façades of the new building for Barcelona Town Hall
- 1983: Olimp. Monument to the Olympic Games, in the CIO office, Lausanne (Switzerland)
- 1984: Monument to Pablo Casals, Vendrell
- Since 1987: Passion Façade of the Sagrada Família in Barcelona
- 1988: Monument to Gaspar de Portolà, Pacifica, California
- 1989: Monument Unió d'Orient i Occident, Seoul (South Korea)
- 1991: Monument to President Macià in the Plaça Catalunya, Barcelona

== Recognitions ==
- Member of the Reial Acadèmia Catalana de Belles Arts de Sant Jordi, Barcelona
- Corresponding Member of the Hispanic Society of America of New York
- Creu de Sant Jordi of the Generalitat de Catalunya
- Medal of the Universitat Autònoma de Barcelona
- Officier dans l'Ordre des Arts et Lettres of France
- Personnalité de l'Année 1987, Paris
- Member of the Real Academia de Bellas Artes de San Fernando, Madrid
- Medalla de Honor, Real Academia de Bellas Artes de Santa Isabel, Hungria

The asteroid 134124 Subirachs, discovered in 2005, was named in his honour.

== Bibliography ==
- Giralt-Miracle, Daniel (1973). Subirachs. Madrid: Servicio de Publicaciones del Ministerio de Educación y Ciencia. ISBN 84-369-0260-2.
- Subirachs, Judit; Subirachs, Josep; Verdaguer, Sala (2003). Subirachs: Volums, Textures, Símbols : Obres de 1953 a 2002 (in Catalan). Barcelona: Generalitat de Catalunya. ISBN 84-393-6002-9. OCLC 865239965.
- Corredor-Matheos, José; Subirachs, Josep (1975). Subirachs. Barcelona: Polígrafa. ISBN 84-343-0217-9. OCLC 802579818.
- Cirlot, Lourdes; Corredor-Matheos, José (1990). Subirachs. Barcelona: Artur Ramon. ISBN 84-404-7514-4. OCLC 733477119.
- Subirachs, Judit (2006). Subirachs a Catalunya: Obra en Espais Públics. Barcelona: Mediterrània. ISBN 84-88591-70-5. OCLC 803741020.
