= Museu Tèxtil i d'Indumentària =

Museum in Barcelona, Spain

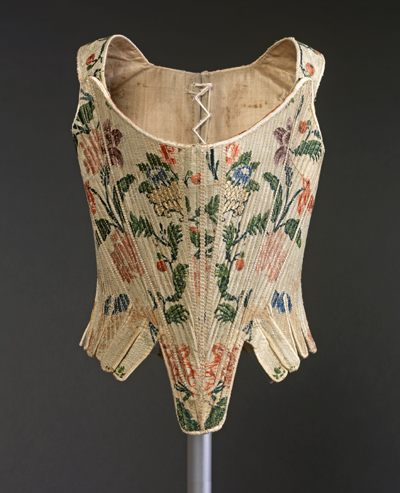
- Location: Barcelona, Spain
- Coordinates: 41.4026°N 2.1880°E
- Website: Official website

The Museu Tèxtil i d'Indumentària, in English Textile and Clothing Museum, was a museum opened on 1982 and located in the Palau Reial de Pedralbes in Barcelona. The museum possessed countless objects and pieces of major artistic and historical value that make up their collections of garments, fabrics and jewellery. Regarding their collection of clothes, the museum allowed you to take a journey through the history of textiles, from the 16th century right up to the modern day. The museum's collections included Coptic, Hispano-Arab, Gothic and Renaissance fabrics, as well as embroidery, a section on lacework and a collection of prints. The jewelry collection comprised approximately five hundred pieces that were made and produced in Spain.

Together with Museu de les Arts Decoratives and the Gabinet de les Arts Gràfiques, it is part of the Disseny Hub Barcelona.

== Palau Reial de Pedralbes ==
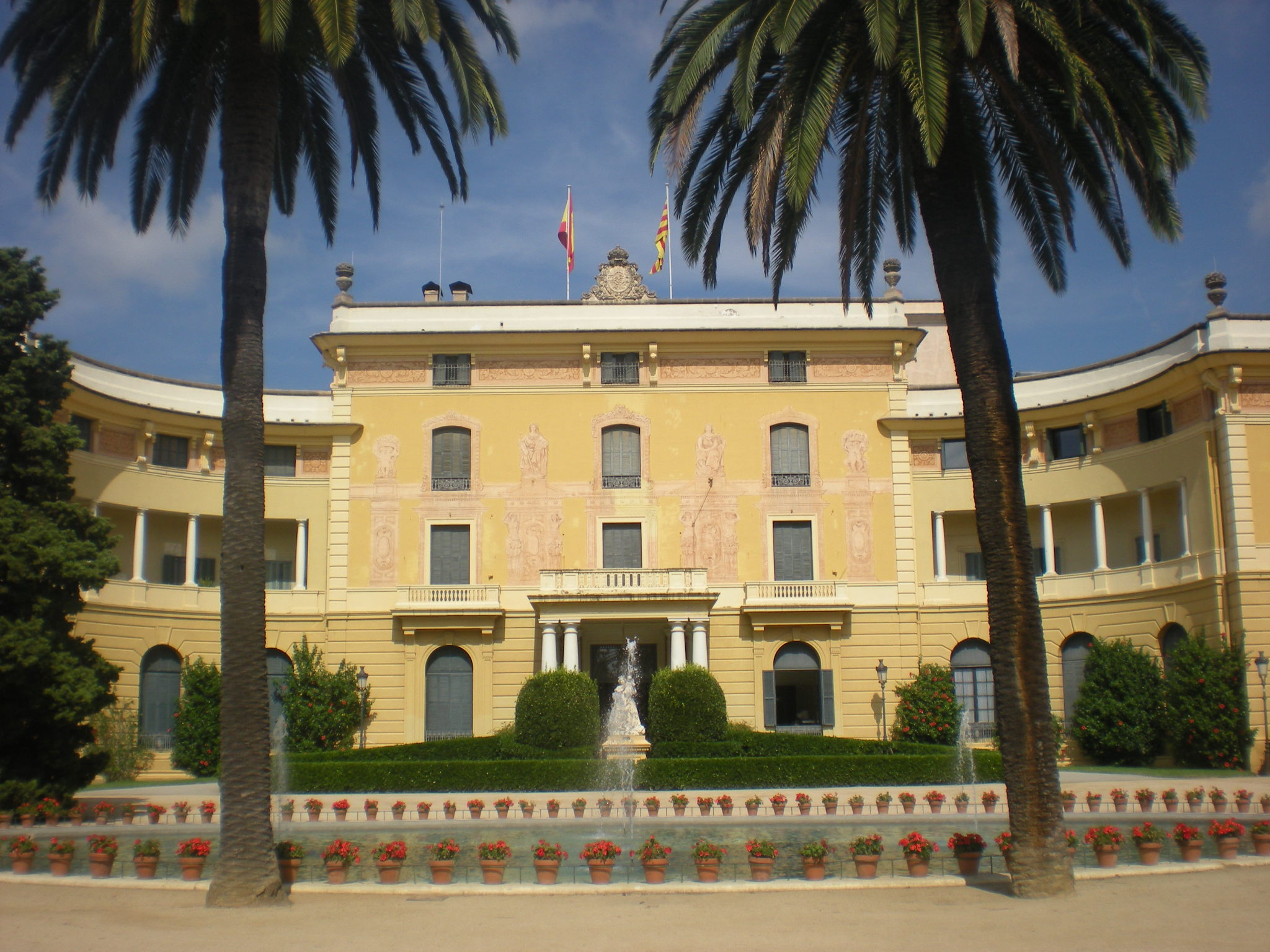
Palau Reial de Pedralbes

The palace has its origins in the old Masia (mas or farmer's house) de Can Feliu, from the 17th century. The corresponding land was acquired by the count Eusebi Güell, along with the neighbouring Can Cuiàs de la Riera. Together they formed the Finca Güell, an extensive parcel of land (30,000 m^{2}). The Can Feliu building was remodeled by the architect Joan Martorell i Montells, who built a Caribbean-style small palace, together with a Gothic-style chapel and surrounded by magnificent gardens. Later the building remodeling was given to Antoni Gaudí, together with the construction of a surrounding perimeter wall and the side entry pavilions. Gaudí also partially designed the gardens surrounding the palace, placing two fountains and a pergola and planted many Mediterranean plants like palm trees, cypress trees, magnolias, pine trees and eucalyptus. The Font d'Hércules (Hercules fountain) still exists today on site, restored in 1983; it has a bust of Hercules on top of a pillar with Catalonia's shield and a spout in the shape of a Chinese dragon. In the Palau Reial de Pedralbes (Diagonal, 686) are placed the DHUB Museums, and you can visit the permanent exhibitions of Museu Tèxtil i d'Indumentària and a permanent exhibition of the Museu de les Arts Decoratives. which later will be passed to the building of Glòries.

== History ==
The history of the Museu Tèxtil i d'Indumentària dates back to 1883, when the Barcelona City Council acquired its first collections of textiles with the objective of creating a monographic museum. For the greater part of the 20th century, the collections of fabrics, clothing and lacework were split between various museums.

In 1961, the Museu Tèxtil opened on the premises of the old Hospital de la Santa Creu. In 1968, the doors of the Museu de les Puntes (Lacework Museum) were opened at the Palau de la Virreina and then, in 1969, at the Palau del Marquès de Lió, the Museu d'Indumentària was born, thanks to the generous donation of Manuel Rocamora. It was not until 1982 that the three museums were united to become the Museu Tèxtil i d'Indumentària.

In 1993, the Museu Tèxtil i d'Indumentària opened a new permanent exhibition to showcase its historic collection of fabrics and clothing, and since 2003 has dedicated its exhibitions to proposals concerned with the culture of fashion.

Finally, in 2008, the museum transferred its collections to the Palau de Pedralbes which led to the opportunity to create a new presentation of the collection: The Dressed Body that demonstrates how clothing has modified body image from the 16th century to the present day.

Currently, the Museu Tèxtil i d'Indumentària in Pedralbes shares its location with Museu Tèxtil i d'Indumentària and the Gabinet de les Arts Gràfiques, an office of Graphic Arts, with which it forms part of the Disseny Hub Barcelona. These collections are expected to move to a new headquarters being built in the Plaça de les Glòries of Barcelona.

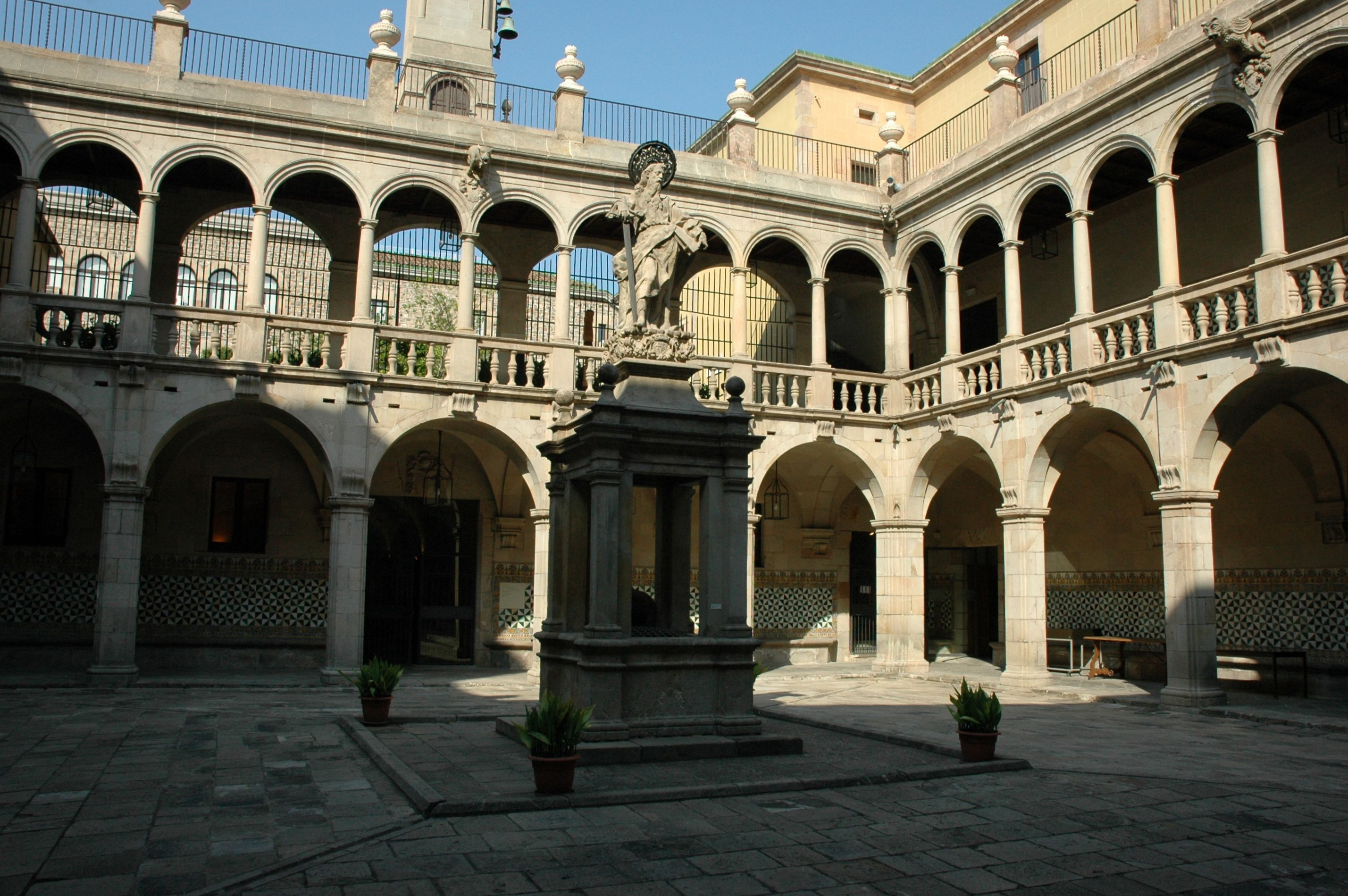
Hospital de la Santa Creu, first building (1961–1982)

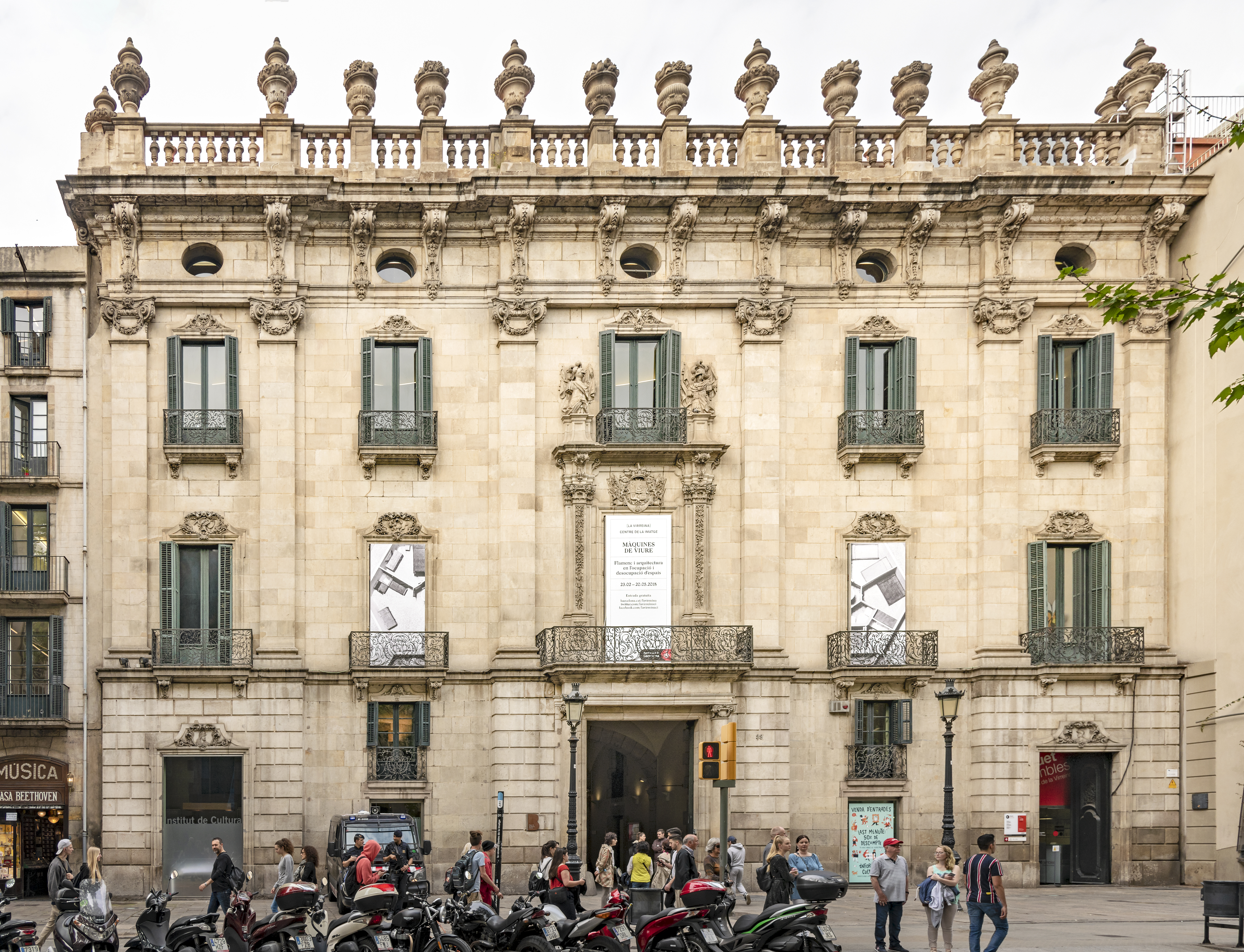
Palau de la Virreina (1968–1982)

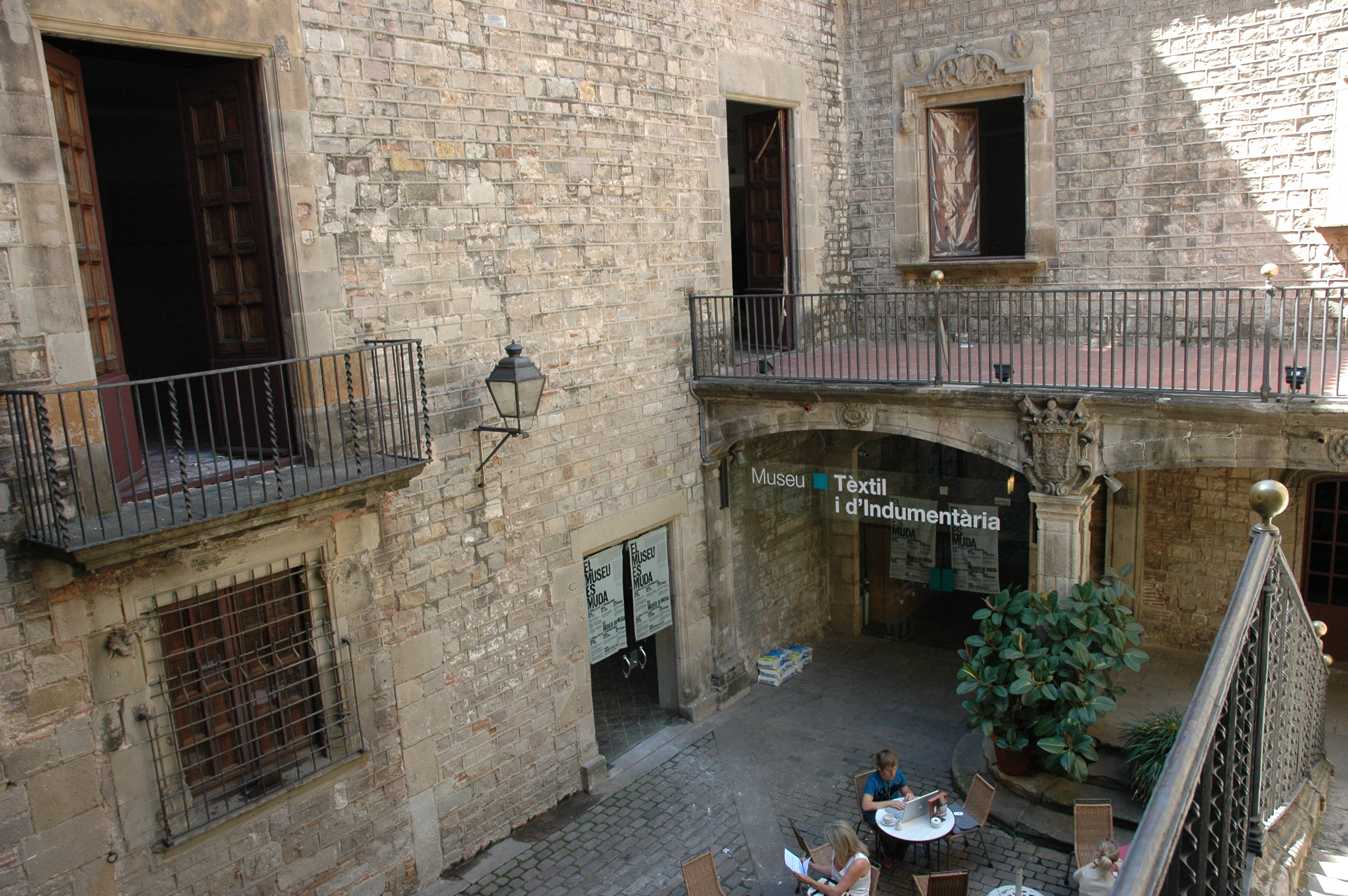
Palau del Marquès de Lió (1969–2008)

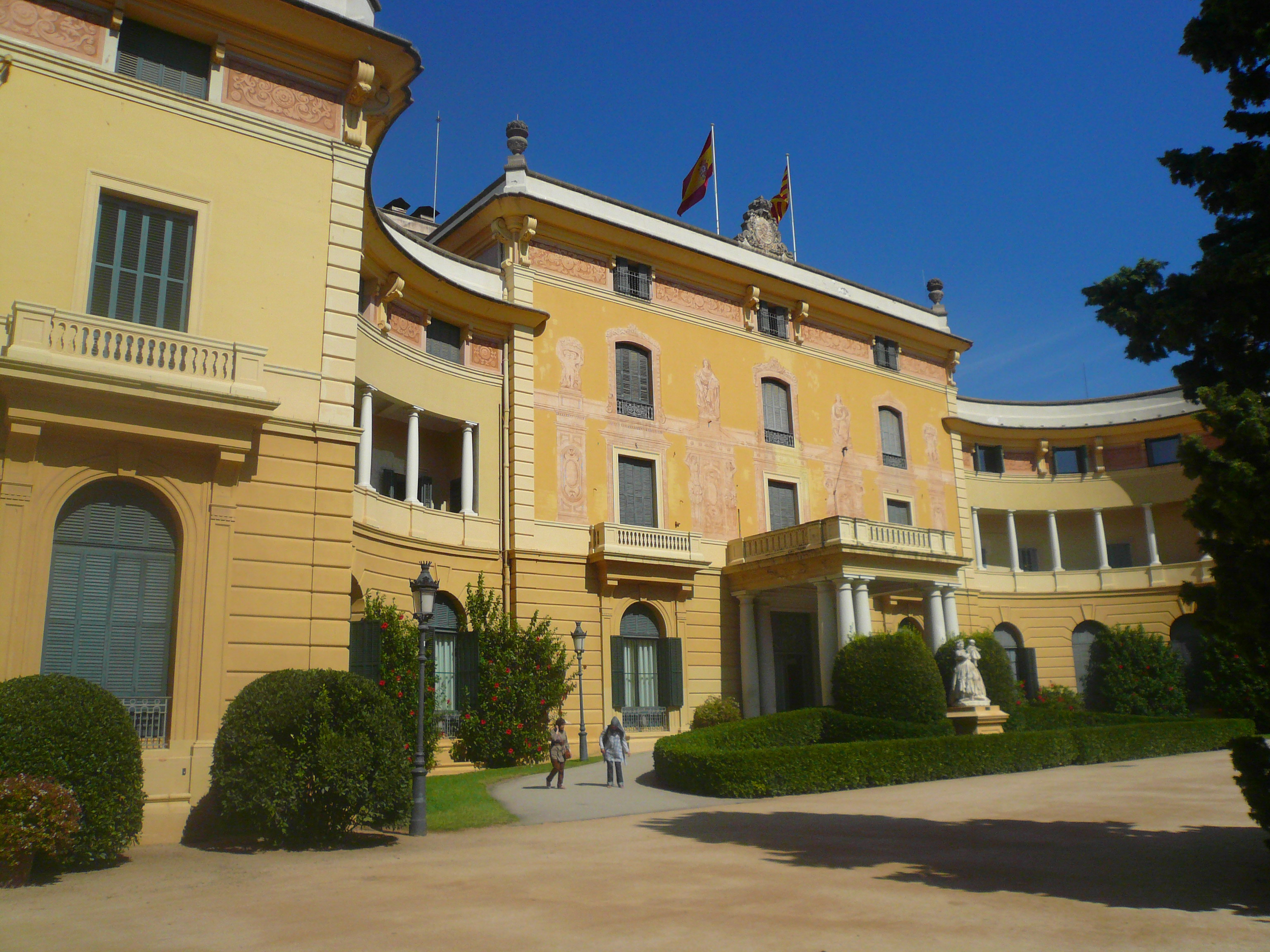
Palau de Pedralbes, (2008- )

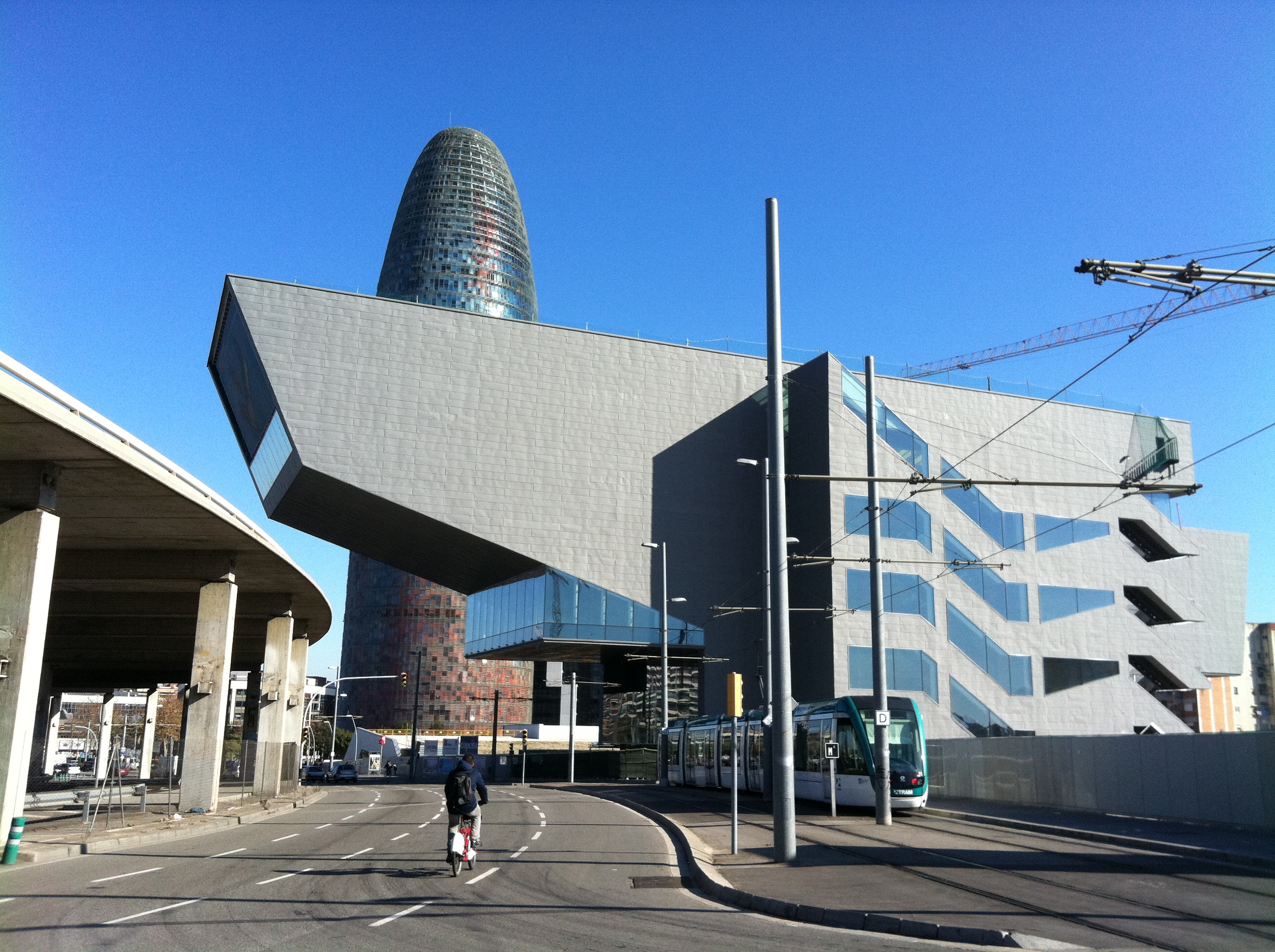
Disseny Hub Barcelona, future building

== Permanent Exhibits ==
Dressing the body

Dressing the body proposes a tour of the history of garments, covering five centuries, from 1550 to 2000 – a game of fascinating parallelisms between the morphology of the human body, socio-cultural events and historic styles. Since ancient times, men and women have altered the form and appearance of their body through hairstyles, jewellery, tattoos and, above all, garments. Each period's way of dressing has to do with moral, social and aesthetic codes.

Fashion imposes ideals of beauty. Silhouettes and volumes are altered – nature gives way to artifice. The exhibition, Dressing the body, depicts the transformations the body has undergone, prompted by changes in clothing involving five different actions, which tend to either confine or liberate it.

Dressing the body has been nominated as one of the 116 Touristic Icons of Catalunya, an initiative that identifies the most significant symbols and manifestations that represent the Catalan visual identity. The collection was prepared by the Agència Catalana de Turisme, the Direcció General de Turisme and Artesania Catalunya of CCAM, the Foment de les Arts i el Disseny (FAD), the Museu Nacional d'Art de Catalunya (MNAC) and the Institut d'Estudis Catalans (IEC).

== Temporary exhibits ==
=== What to Wear? Maria Brillas' Wardrobe by Pedro Rodríguez ===
The Disseny Hub Barcelona hosted an exhibition featuring approximately fifty pieces from the Maria Brillas collection created by 20th-century haute couture designer Pedro Rodríguez. Titled around the question of self-identity and clothing choices, the exhibition explored how garments contribute to personal identity, the factors influencing individual self-presentation, and the autobiographical role of personal wardrobes.

The exhibits on display are part of a collection donated by Hilda Bencomo, Maria Brillas' granddaughter, to the Museu Tèxtil i d'Indumentària, which comprises 341 pieces, 183 dresses and 158 accessories. The ensemble re-creates the world of references which Pedro Rodríguez used to conceptualise his oeuvre, much of which belongs to the mainstream of Spanish fashion design. His career, spanning Barcelona, Madrid and San Sebastián, ran from 1919 to 1980. The story of Maria Brillas, as told by her dresses, created by Pedro Rodríguez, is part of Barcelona's history and belongs to the cultural heritage of Catalonia and Spain.
