= Gabinet de les Arts Gràfiques =

Museum in Barcelona, Spain

Coordinates: 41°23′18.2″N 2°7′1.3″E

The Gabinet de les Arts Gràfiques, in English Graphic Arts Cabinet, is a museum opened in 1942 and located in the Palau Reial de Pedralbes in Barcelona. Together with Museu de les Arts Decoratives and the Museu Tèxtil i d'Indumentària, it is part of the Disseny Hub Barcelona.

== Palau Reial de Pedralbes ==
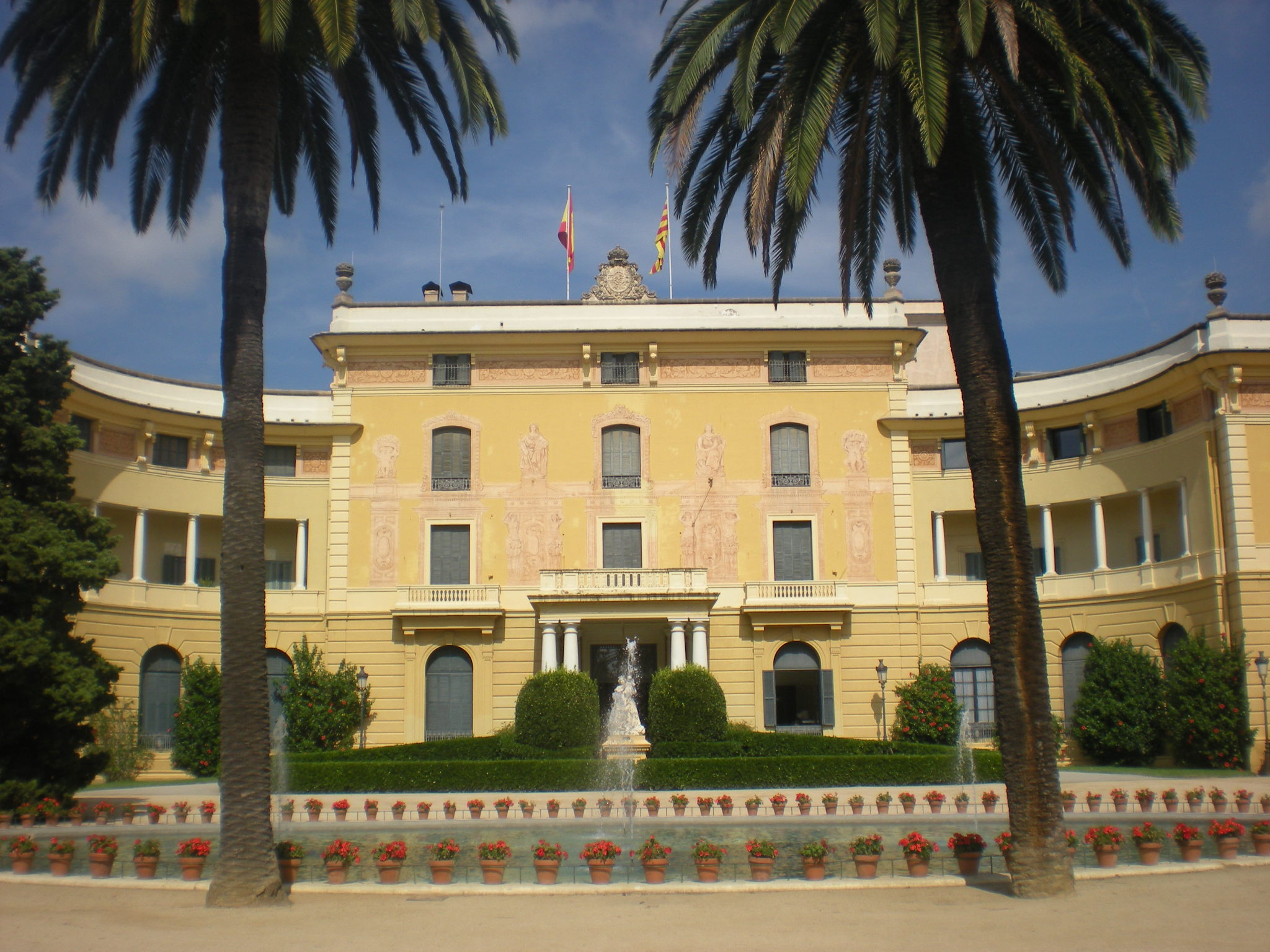
Palau Reial de Pedralbes

The palace has its origins in the old Masia (mas or Provençal farmhouse) de Can Feliu, from the 17th century. The corresponding land was acquired by the count Eusebi Güell, along with the neighbouring Can Cuiàs de la Riera. Together they formed the Finca Güell, an extensive parcel of land (30,000 m^{2}). The Can Feliu building was remodeled by the architect Joan Martorell i Montells, who built a Caribbean-style small palace, together with a Gothic-style chapel and surrounded by magnificent gardens. Later the building remodeling was given to Antoni Gaudí, together with the construction of a surrounding perimeter wall and the side entry pavilions. Gaudí also partially designed the gardens surrounding the palace, placing two fountains and a pergola and planted many Mediterranean plants like palm trees, cypress trees, magnolias, pine trees and eucalyptus. The Font d'Hércules (Hercules fountain) still exists today on site, restored in 1983; it has a bust of Hercules on top of a pillar with Catalonia's shield and a spout in the shape of a Chinese dragon. In the Palau Reial de Pedralbes (Diagonal, 686) are placed the DHUB Museums, and you can visit the permanent exhibitions of Museu Tèxtil i d'Indumentària and a permanent exhibition of the Museu de les Arts Decoratives. which later will be passed to the building of Glòries.

== History ==
In 1942, the Museu d'Arts, Indústries i Tradicions Populars created a popular engraving department, using the wood engraving blocks assembled by the Board of Museums before the war. In 1968, due to a growing contribution of diverse materials (machines, moulds, blocks and printed materials) this small museum, located in the Poble Espanyol, began to expand its radius of operation and adopted the name Secció de Gravat i Arts Gràfiques. In 1974 it expanded once again to house an active print shop and was renamed the Museu del Llibre i de les Arts Gràfiques, although the operative opening of the print shop did not happen until 1981.

The museum now forms part of the Disseny Hub Barcelona, and its collections have been relocated to their present home in the repository of the Palau de Pedralbes.

== Collections ==
The collections of the museum bring together significant samples of typography such as punches, matrices and tracing plates, as well as, prints that include samples of binding, packaging, labels and posters. Important printers such as; Elzeviriana, Bobes, Seix Barral and Tobella, Naips Comas (the makers of playing cards), Tallers Roca (the industrial bookbinders) and the Neufville type foundry, have contributed to the museum's expanding resources. In addition, certain artists and their families, have also donated graphic works and engraving moulds – as is the case of Miquel Plana and the families of Josep Obiols and Miquel Llovet. The collection is presented during exhibitions and study galleries programmed by Disseny Hub Barcelona.

The concept that initiated the Study Galleries was to create an area that combines the ideas of a temporary exhibition, a documentation centre and a museum repository but that has its own identity. Various objects are assembled according to their typologies and presented in a way that allows visitors to study, contemplate and reflect upon the museums collections.

== Exhibits ==
=== Posters. Collection at the Gabinet de les Arts Gràfiques. ===
The Collection at the Gabinet de les Arts Gràfiques includes 146 posters displayed in two distinct galleries. The first organizes posters in a historical context that brings together Spanish graphic designs from 1880 until 1980. The second space is organized thematically, and includes posters created by the youngest designers of the 1960s and organized according to their function, characteristics, genres, elements (colour), components (typography, photography, illustration) and formats. When deciding which posters would become part of this study gallery, the curator Raquel Pelta (of the Foundation for the History of Design), took into account the value of the work from a graphic design perspective: the value of the elements of the whole, the innovative character in regards to the moment in which it was created and the balance between form and function. Direction: Marta Montmany Curator: Raquel Pelta, with the collaboration of Anna Calvera.
