= Museu de les Arts Decoratives =

Museum in Barcelona, Spain

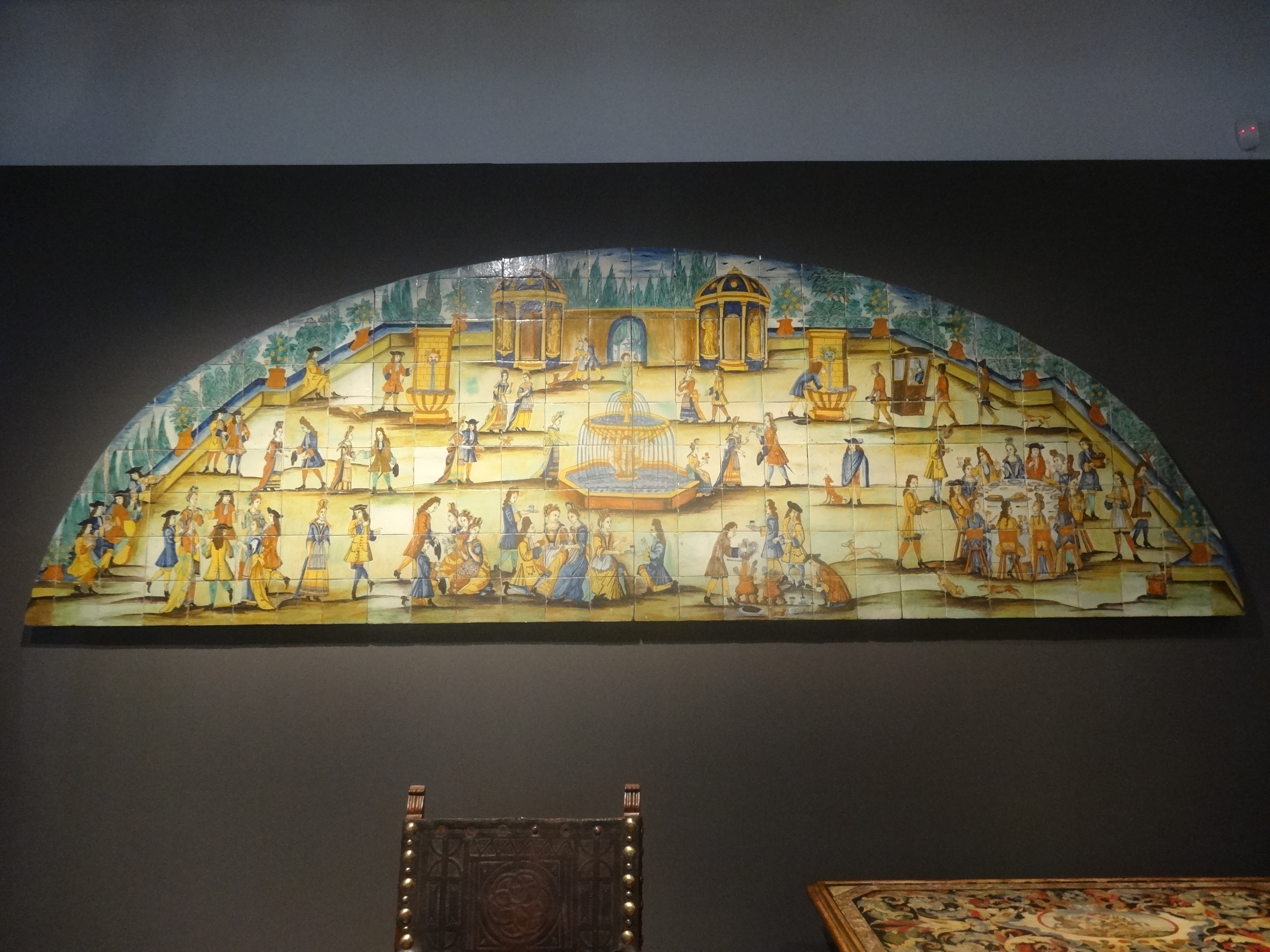
- Location: Barcelona, Spain
- Website: Official website

The Museu de les Arts Decoratives, in English Decorative Arts Museum, is a museum opened in 1932 and located in the Palau Reial de Pedralbes in Barcelona. Created in 1932, this historic museum contains a rich and diverse collection of European decorative arts, from the Middle Ages to the Industrial Revolution. In 1995, the museum extended its boundaries with the incorporation of design, thus converting it into the first and only statewide museum concerned with the preservation and exhibition of Spanish industrial design. The collections of the Museu de les Arts Decoratives were created from an important resource of industrial design and decorative art objects, that included salvers, carriages, furniture, wallpaper, clocks, tapestries and glasswork.

Together with Museu Tèxtil i d'Indumentària and the Gabinet de les Arts Gràfiques, it is part of the Disseny Hub Barcelona.

== Palau Reial de Pedralbes ==
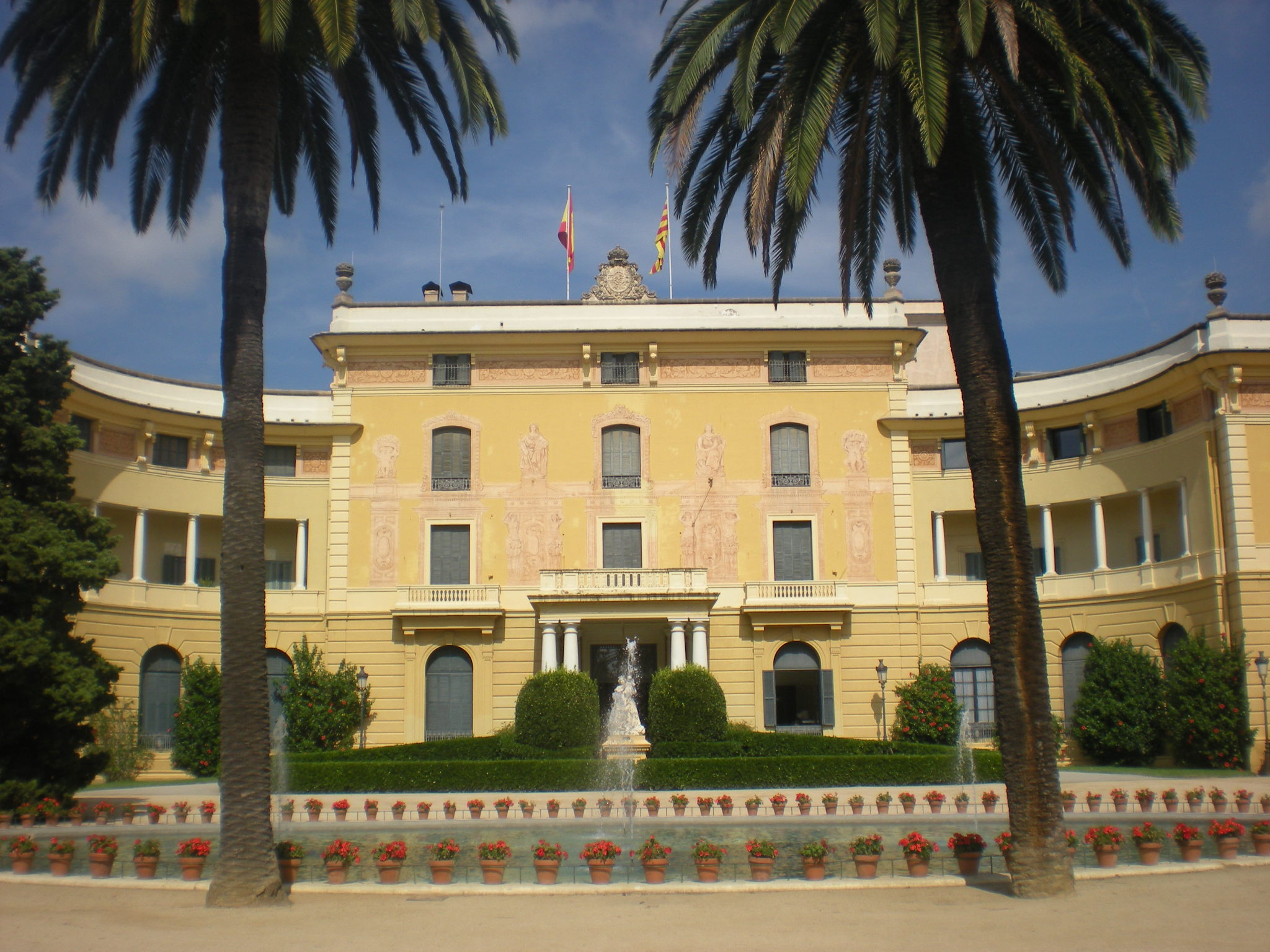
Palau Reial de Pedralbes

The palace has its origins in the old Masia (mas or farmer's house) de Can Feliu, from the 17th century. The corresponding land was acquired by the count Eusebi Güell, along with the neighbouring Can Cuiàs de la Riera. Together they formed the Finca Güell, an extensive parcel of land (30,000 m^{2}). The Can Feliu building was remodeled by the architect Joan Martorell i Montells, who built a Caribbean-style small palace, together with a Gothic-style chapel and surrounded by magnificent gardens. Later the building remodeling was given to Antoni Gaudí, together with the construction of a surrounding perimeter wall and the side entry pavilions. Gaudí also partially designed the gardens surrounding the palace, placing two fountains and a pergola and planted many Mediterranean plants like palm trees, cypress trees, magnolias, pine trees and eucalyptus. The Font d'Hércules (Hercules fountain) still exists today on site, restored in 1983; it has a bust of Hercules on top of a pillar with Catalonia's shield and a spout in the shape of a Chinese dragon. In the Palau Reial de Pedralbes (Diagonal, 686) are placed the DHUB Museums, and you can visit the permanent exhibitions of Museu Tèxtil i d'Indumentària and a permanent exhibition of the Museu de les Arts Decoratives which later will be passed to the building of Glòries.

== History ==
The museum opened in 1932 at the Palau Reial de Pedralbes. Its origin, however, dates back to 1888, following the Exposition held in Barcelona. Upon completion of this event, the city council thought of bringing together different collections of cultural and museum open several centers. Thus, in 1902 created the Museu d'Art Decoratiu i Arqueològic in the old arsenal of the Ciutadella, consisting of a set of heterogeneous collections. The Barcelona architect and councilor at the time, Josep Puig, designed and planned the museum at all levels, from assembly to the windows museofràfic containing objects.

In 1932, the Museum of Decorative Art and Archaeological underwent a complete restructuring and was dismantled. The collections were moved to Montjuïc to constitute, on the one hand, the National Art Museum of Catalonia and the other, the Museum of Archaeology of Catalonia. Objects not included either in the category of Fine Arts or the archaeological material, were taken to the Palace of Pedralbes by decision of the Junta de Museus, a board decision committee, thus forming the current Museum Decorative Arts.

In 1936, with the outbreak of the Spanish Civil War, the museum was closed and moved his background in Olot to ensure its protection during the conflict. After the war, the Pedralbes Palace became the residence of Barcelona's new head of state, Francisco Franco Bahamonde, so that the Museum of Decorative Arts lost his seat.

In 1949, the museum reopened in a new location, the Palace Virreina, which organized the exhibition spaces in a similar way as they were in the previous location. During this period, the museum collection grew considerably with the addition of various collections, as the lot of furniture from the collection of Matias Muntadas, or furniture work of Francesc Vidal from the collection Bertrand i Mata.

In 1985, however, it was decided a new municipal use for Virreina, and the Museum of Decorative Arts had to shut the doors again. The collections were moved back to the Palace of Pedralbes and stored in this building reserves for a decade.

In 1995, the museum reopened to the public, recovering the exhibition spaces of the Palace of Pedralbes and incorporating as an important new collection of industrial design Spanish.

Currently, the Museum of Decorative Arts in Pedralbes share its location with Museu Tèxtil i d'Indumentària and the Gabinet de les Arts Gràfiques, an office of Graphic Arts, with which it forms part of the Disseny Hub Barcelona. These collections are expected to move to a new headquarters being built in the Plaça de les Glòries of Barcelona.

== Exhibits ==
From the One-off Object to Product Design

The permanent exhibition of the Museu de les Arts Decoratives presents a chronological itinerary in two parts. The first part demonstrates the evolution of objets d'art from the Romanesque to Romanticism, and with an emphasis on Catalan production, it also shows the birth of product design during the Industrial Revolution in Occidental Europe. The majority of objects in the exhibition were designed for personal use and as such, have been presented in a way that illustrates everyday life and production processes (both artisanal and industrial), from the 19th century onward. At the museum, you will find furniture from wealthy, affluent homes, including wedding chests, beds, chairs and vanities, as well as a variety of common-use objects such as tableware, fans and watches. The second part of the exhibit focuses on the development of product design, with the presentation of 442 pieces that form a representative sample of industrial design in Spain. Conceptually the exhibition follows the journey of a designed product by socially contextualizing it in Barcelona, specifically and more generally throughout Spain.
