= Royal Palace of Pedralbes =

Building in Barcelona, Spain

Coordinates: 41°23′18.2″N 2°7′1.3″E

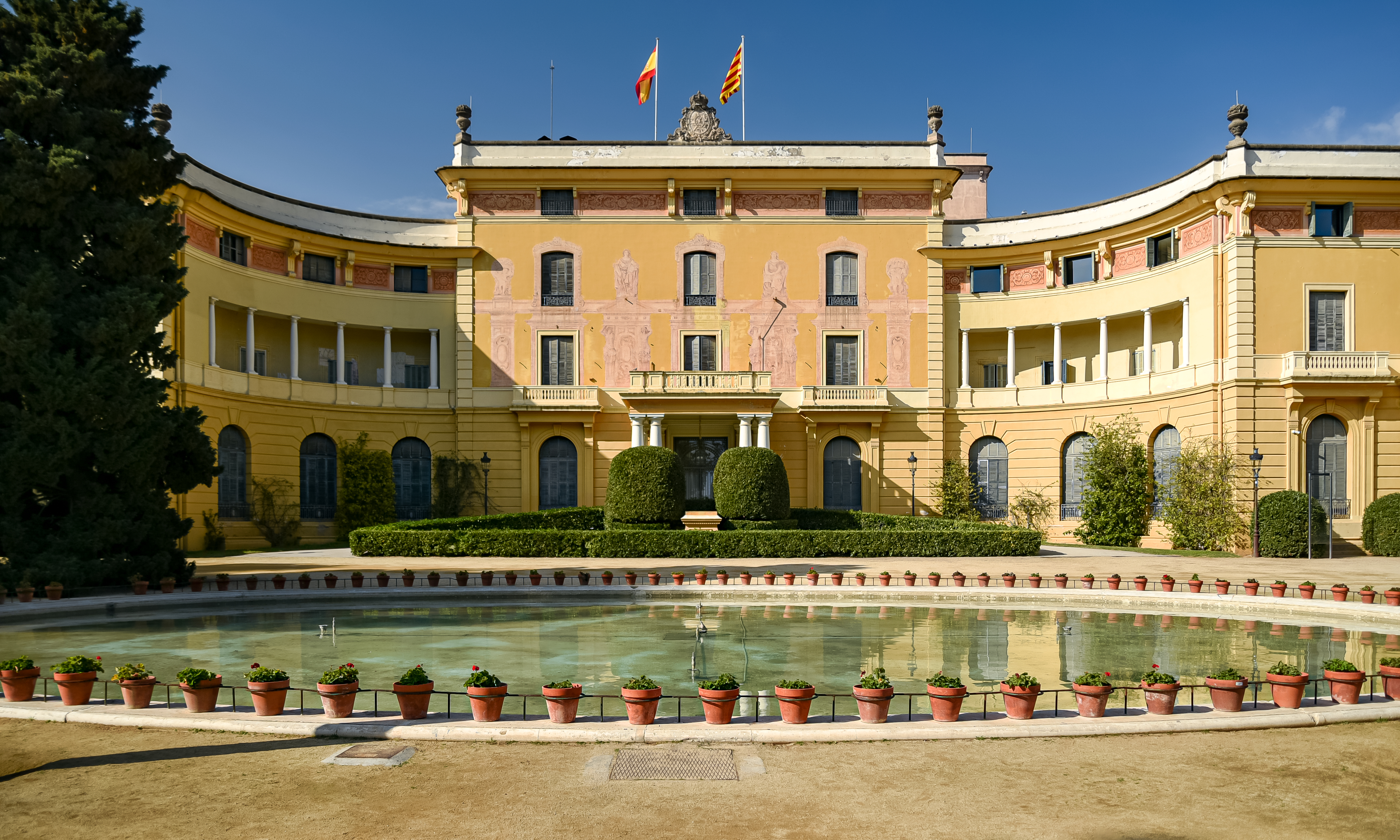
Pedralbes Royal Palace

The Royal Palace of Pedralbes (Spanish: Palacio Real de Pedralbes; Catalan: Palau Reial de Pedralbes) is a building placed in the middle of an ample garden in the district of Les Corts, in Barcelona. From 1919 until 1931 and since 1975 it has been the official residence for the Spanish royal family when they visit the city, although they currently prefer the Palace of Albéniz. It also houses the Ceramic Museum, the Textile and Clothing Museum and the Decorative Arts Museum, both part of the Disseny Hub Barcelona and is the permanent seat of the Union for the Mediterranean (UfM).

== History and description ==
The palace has its origins in the old Masia (mas or farmer's house) de Can Feliu, from the 17th century. The corresponding land was acquired by the count Eusebi Güell in 1872 that at that time it was already known by the name of Torre Güell, along with the neighbouring Can Cuiàs de la Riera. Together they formed the Finca Güell, an extensive parcel of land (30,000 m^{2}). The Can Feliu building was remodeled by the architect Joan Martorell i Montells, who built a Caribbean-style small palace, together with a Gothic Revival-style chapel and surrounded by magnificent gardens. Later the building remodeling was given to Antoni Gaudí in 1887, together with the construction of a surrounding perimeter wall and the side entry pavilions. Gaudí also partially designed the gardens surrounding the palace, placing two fountains and a pergola and planted many Mediterranean plants like palm trees, cypress trees, magnolias, pine trees and eucalyptus. The Font d'Hércules (Hercules fountain) still exists today on site, restored in 1983; it has a bust of Hercules on top of a pillar with Catalonia's shield and a spout in the shape of a Chinese dragon.

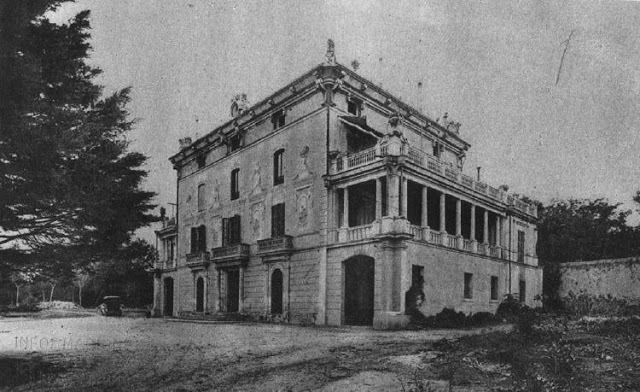
"Torre Guell" in 1900

Eusebi Güell gave the house and garden to the royal family, as a thank you for his noble title of Count given to him, in 1918. The house was then remodeled to become a royal palace. The work was done from 1919 to 1924 by the architects Eusebi Bona and Francesc Nebot. The palace is formed by a central building four stories high, with a chapel on the back side and two three stories high side wings that form a curve with the front facade towards the front. The outside facade is done in the Noucentisme movement style with Tuscan order columns forming two porches, with round arches and medallions and jars on the top. The interior of the building is of many styles both in decoration as in furniture, going from Louis XIV style to contemporary styles. The gardens were designed by Nicolau Maria Rubió i Tudurí, from a design that included, in a geometrically decorative area, many of the trees already present, a pond with many decorative elements, Gaudi's fountain, bamboo benches, three lighted fountains by Carles Buïgas, the same designer of the Magic Fountain in Montjuïc and many statues such is the one of Queen Isabella II with her son Alfonso XII on the front of the palace, a work of Agapit Vallmitjana.

On 8 June 1926, the Baron of Viver, Mayor of Barcelona, ceded the Palace of Pedralbes and its grounds to the Royal Patrimonio Nacional, and the King of Spain and his family made use of it. In 1929, the royal family housed to the Royal Palace of Pedralbes on the occasion of the 1929 Barcelona International Exposition. The king used it for the last time in January and May 1930, during his last visits to the city.

With the second Spanish Republic's proclamation in 1931, it became property of the city government, which decided to make it a decorative arts museum, inaugurated in 1932. During Francisco Franco's regime it was used as a residence for Franco during his visits to the city. In 1990 the Museu de Ceramica was placed at the palace.

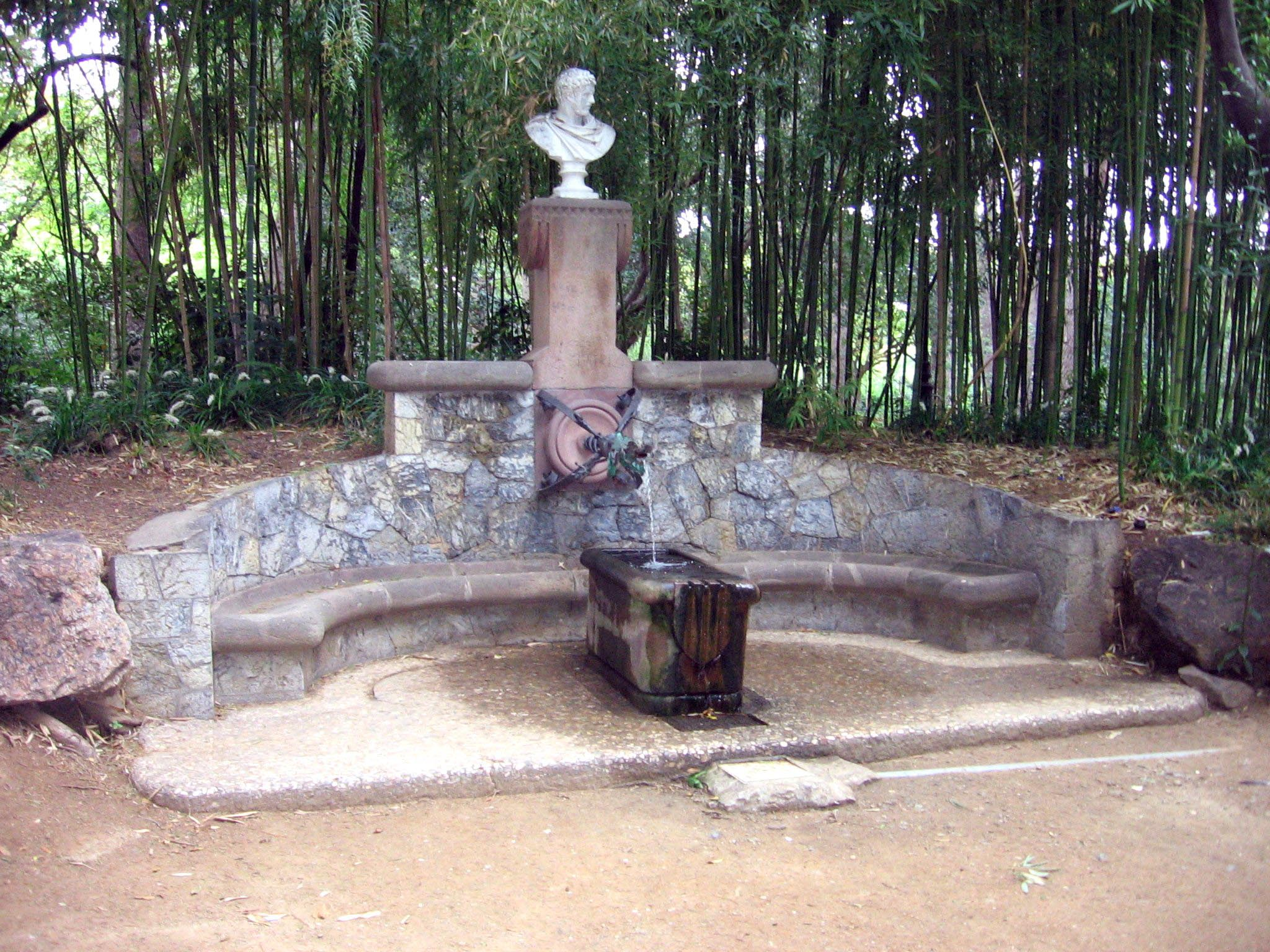
Font d'Hércules, by Antoni Gaudí

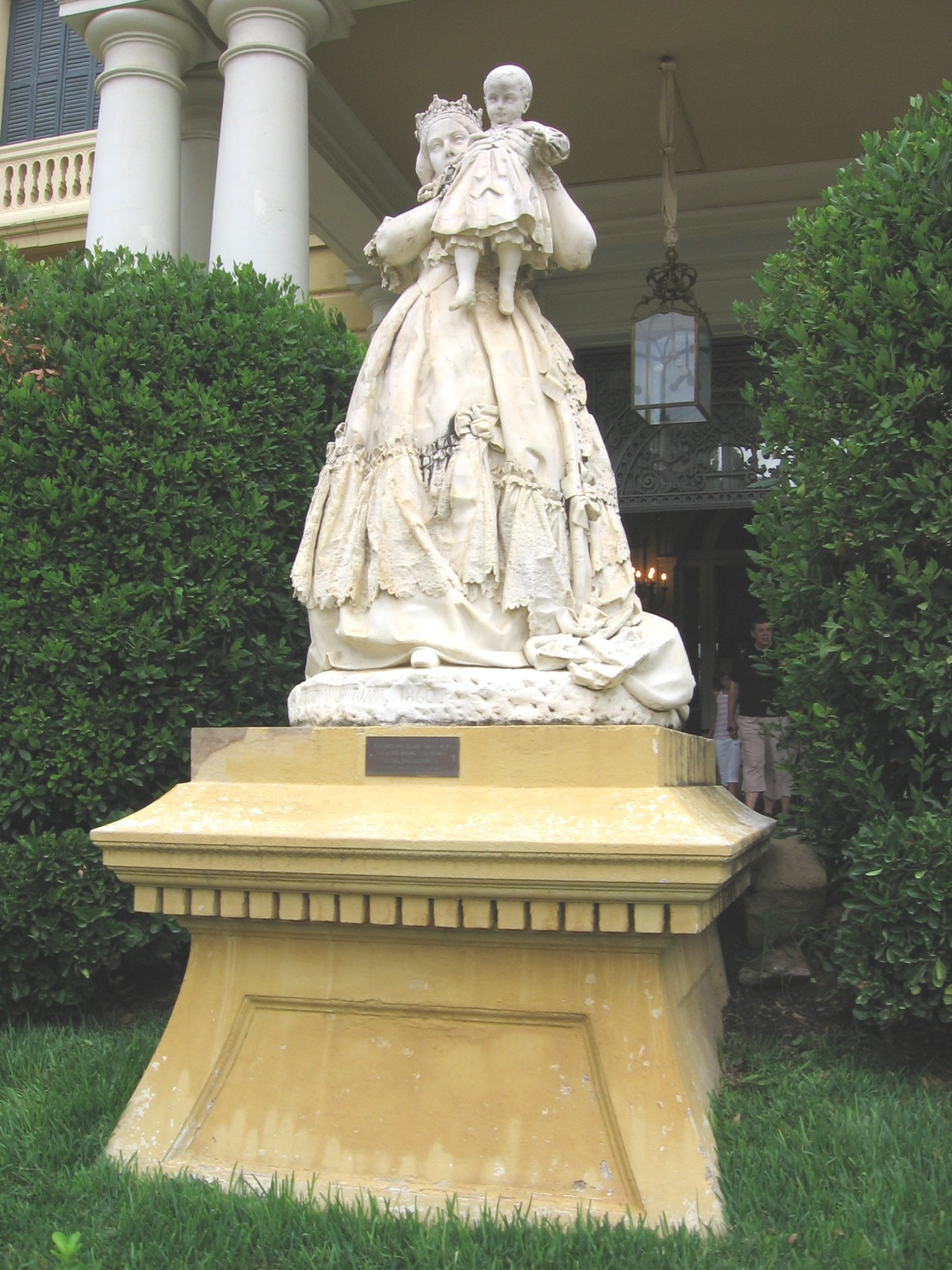
Isabella II showing her son, Alfonso XII, by Agapit Vallmitjana i Barbany

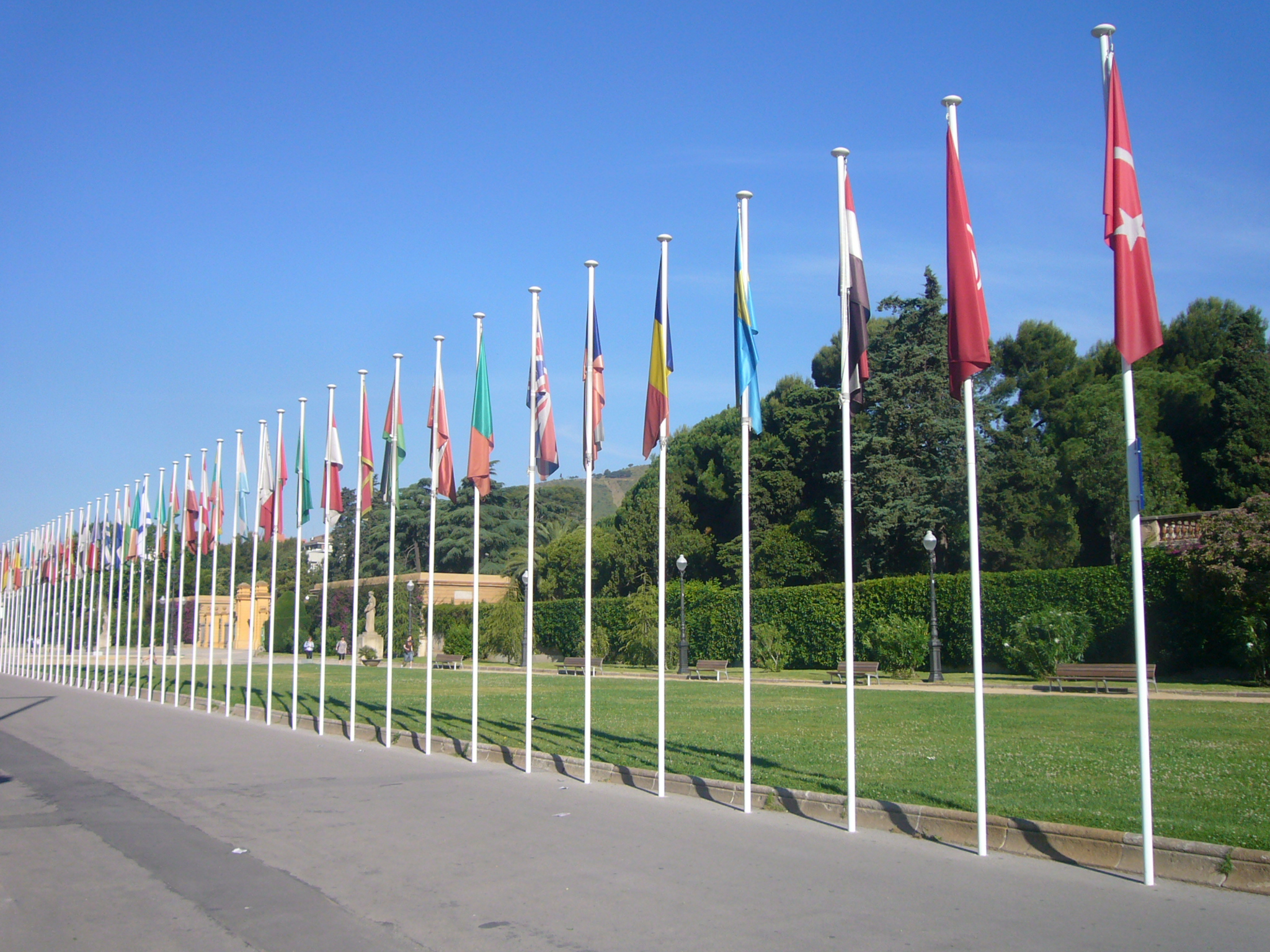
Flags of UfM members, at the palace entrance

== The Royal Chambers ==
The Palau de Pedralbes and by extension the Royal Chambers which include Alfonso XIII's bedroom, and Victoria Eugenia's waiting room and chamber, were constructed between 1919 and 1924. The architects Eusebi Bona and Francesc de Paula Nebot were commissioned to build this home for the King and his family during their brief and sporadic visits to Barcelona.

Alfons XIII's chamber, and the waiting room and chamber of Victòria Eugènia, were added to the itinerary of the Museu de les Arts Decoratives exhibit after the fall of the monarchy, when the royal residence first opened its doors in 1932. The public was now able to view the three chambers which had been left in their original conditions in regards to wall murals and furniture, by the former occupants who had been sent into exile.

Despite all of the political changes that the building has passed through, (monarchy, republic, civil war, dictatorship, monarchy) that could have led to changes in the construction of the Palau de Pedralbes, the royal chambers have been preserved almost completely in their original state. The spaces, decorated by King Alfons XIII and his wife Queen Victòria Eugènia in their own personal styles and using their own financial resources, still carry the stamp of their former occupants.

During the 1920s, the winds of modernity arrived in Barcelona with Mies van der Rohe's Barcelona Pavilion at the 1929 Barcelona International Exposition. The King visited the exhibit and was honoured with a personal tour by the architect himself. Despite these new influences, the decoration of the royal chambers, which was harmonious with some very interesting furnishings, was conceived using clear historical parameters under the direction of a conservative aristocrat anchored in the past.

== Bibliography ==
- AA.VV.: Art de Catalunya, Edicions L'Isard, Barcelona, 1998, ISBN 84-921314-5-4.
- AA.VV.: Història de l'art català, Edicions 62, Barcelona, 2005, ISBN 84-297-1997-0.
- Manuel García Martín: Estatuària pública de Barcelona, Catalana de Gas y Electricidad S.A., Barcelona, 1985, ISBN 84-398-2323-1.
