= Bastide (Provençal manor) =

Local term for a manor house in Provence, France

Bastide is a local term for a manor house in Provence, in the south of France, located in the countryside or in a village, and originally occupied by a wealthy farmer. A bastide is larger and more elegant than the farmhouse called a mas, and is square or rectangular, with a tile roof, walls of fine ashlar-stone sometimes covered with stucco or whitewashed, and often built in a square around a courtyard. In the 19th and 20th centuries, many bastides were used as summer houses by wealthy citizens of Marseille. More recently, most bastides in Provence have been transformed into expensive country homes.

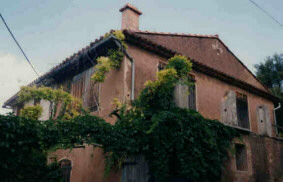
The Bastide Neuve in La Treille, the summer vacation home of writer Marcel Pagnol

One well-known bastide in Provence is the Bastide Neuve, located in the village of La Treille near Marseille, which was a summer house for the family of French writer and filmmaker Marcel Pagnol. César Soubeyran, the wealthy farmer in his novels Jean de Florette and Manon des Sources, lived in a bastide.

Other notable bastides include:

- Bastide Bel-Air
- Bastide Les Brégues d'Or
- Bastide de la Guillermy
- Bastide du Jas de Bouffan
- Bastide d'Orcel
- Bastide de Repentance
- Clos de Villeneuve

== See also ==
- Architecture of Provence
- Mas (Provençal farmhouse)
- Bastide
