= Bastide de la Guillermy =

Historic building in Marseille, France

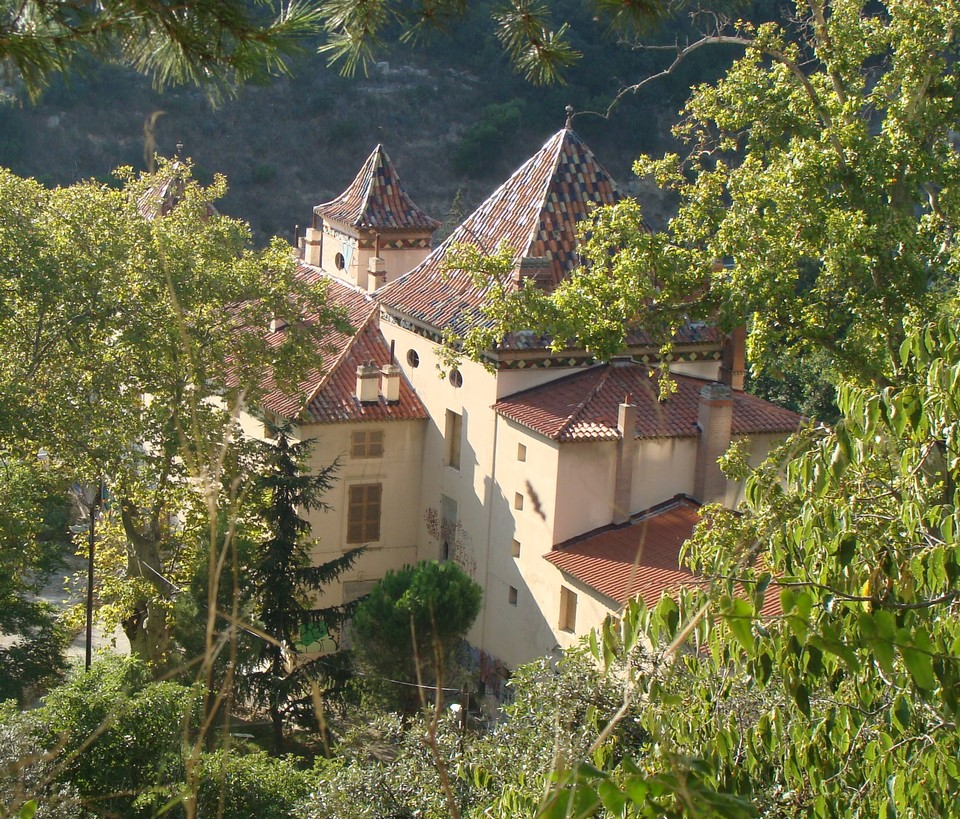

General information
- Town or city: Marseille
- Country: France
- Coordinates: 43.3578°N 5.3633°E
- Completed: 17th century

The Bastide de la Guillermy is a historic bastide in Les Aygalades, a neighbourhood in the 15th arrondissement of Marseille, France. It was built in the 17th century, making it one of the oldest buildings in Marseille.

== History ==
In 1689, the de Guillermy family acquired the land (which formerly belonged to the 16th century poet Jean de La Ceppède) and built the bastide shortly after. It is one of the oldest buildings in Marseille. Over the next few centuries, the family hosted Paul Barras and later Princess Françoise of Orléans. The bastide was subsequently purchased by the Savin family.

By 1941, the bastide was owned by Mr Rousset, who rented it to the police. Meanwhile, the Nazi invaders began the construction of the A7 autoroute near the bastide.

The bastide was acquired by the French state in 1957. It was home to the French police until 2004.

In 2009, the French state suggested turning the empty bastide into temporary housing for Romani people. The project was abandoned due to protests. In 2011, the bastide was listed for sale.
