= Bastide Les Brégues d'Or =

Coordinates: 43.4955°N 5.4411°E

- Interactive map of the Bastide Les Brégues d'Or area

The Bastide Les Brégues d'Or is a historic bastide in Luynes, a village near Aix-en-Provence, France.

== Location ==
It is located on the chemin de la Carrière in Luynes, near Aix-en-Provence, in south-east France.

== History ==
The bastide was built in the second half of the 18th century.

== Architectural significance ==
It has been listed as an official historical monument by the French Ministry of Culture since 1989.
