= Bastide d'Orcel =

- Interactive map of Bastide d'Orcel
- Type: Manor house
- Location: Aix-en-Provence, France
- Coordinates: 43°30′57″N 5°23′50″E
- Built: 18th century

Monument historique
- Designated: 21 December 1984
- Reference no.: PA00080977

The Bastide d'Orcel is a historic bastide in Aix-en-Provence, France. It is located on the route de Galice in Aix-en-Provence, in southeastern France.

The bastide was completed in 1777, a decade before the French Revolution of 1789. It has been listed as an official historical monument by the French Ministry of Culture since 1984.
