= Jean de La Ceppède =

French poet (c. 1550–1623)

- Born: c. 1550; Marseille, France
- Died: 1623; Avignon, France
- Occupations: judge and politician
- Known for: devotional poetry
- Title: President of the Court of Audit
- Predecessor: Hughes de Bompart de Magnan
- Spouses: Madeleine de Brancas-Ceyreste; Anne de Faret
- Children: Angélique
- Parent(s): Jean-Baptiste de La Ceppède; Claude de Bompar

Jean de La Ceppède (c. 1550 – 1623) was a French nobleman, judge, and poet from Aix-en-Provence. He was a Christian poet and wrote Alexandrine sonnets in Middle French during the Renaissance in France. He is best known for his Les Théorèmes sur le Sacré Mystère de Nostre Rédemption, a sequence of 515 sonnets, published in two volumes in 1613 and 1622. Taken together, the sonnets are an exegesis on the Passion and Resurrection of Jesus Christ, with many references and comparisons to figures from Classical mythology and taking a heuristic approach.

== Early life ==
Jean de La Ceppède was born circa 1550 in Marseille. His father was Jean-Baptiste de La Ceppède and his mother, Claude de Bompar. According to Keith Bosley, the La Ceppède family was of Spanish heritage and may have been related to Saint Teresa of Avila, who was born a Cepeda.

He received his Doctorate in Law in 1577.

== Career ==
La Ceppède became an Advisor to the Parlement of Aix-en-Provence on 22 October 1578. He advised Perrinet de Rouillas. He became the President of the Court of Audit in 1583, replacing Hughes de Bompar de Magnan. He became its First President on 14 July 1608, replacing Jean de Rollands de Réauville and, as the President of a Parliament Court, de La Ceppède was enrolled in the ranks of the Nobles of the Robe.

Despite his fervent Catholicism, La Ceppède was a politique and, after the murder of Henry III, supported the claim of the Calvinist Henri of Navarre under Salic Law to the throne during the French Wars of Religion. For this reason, La Ceppède was arrested in 1589, after the Parlement of Aix-en-Provence fell to the armies of the militantly anti-Protestant Catholic League. La Ceppède attempted to escape disguised as a Franciscan monk, but was shot in the leg and recaptured. He was later released on the orders of a senior member of the League, Hubert du Vins, who held him in esteem. It was only in 1596 that Marseille fell to the armies of the now-Catholic King Henri IV.

La Ceppède acquired the estate of Aygalades from Melchior de Fallet on 31 March 1599. As a result, he became known as the Seigneur (or "Lord of the manor") of Ayglades. The estate was home to a community of Carmelites, and in 1621 La Ceppède funded the reconstruction of their chapel.

== Literary career ==
During the French Wars of Religion, La Ceppède belonged to a Royalist literary circle which included César de Nostredame, son of Nostradamus, as well as Louis Galaup de Chasteuil, historian and antiquary known for his immense erudition. During the same period, La Ceppède began writing the sonnets that appear in the Theorems.

As France was increasingly reunified by the armies of King Henry IV, La Ceppède in 1594 published his first collection of poems, which was an imitation of the Seven Penitential Psalms. According to Keith Bosley, La Ceppède's book was one of many peace offerings to the new King by the poets of Provence, where support for the Catholic League had been overwhelming. Paul A. Chilton deduces that this collection was written from 1590 to 1592, at the height of the wars after the assassination of Henry III, and before Henry IV came to the throne.

Accord to a 2012 article about La Ceppède by Christopher O. Blum, "It was in 1594, at the end of the French Wars of Religion, that he published his first work, an imitation of the Penitential Psalms of David. In a dedicatory epistle that was an extended meditation upon theme of shipwreck, he declared his desire to 'dispose his soul and, with it, poor France' to look to the Cross for safety and to take 'the good David' as guide for 'this perilous navigation.' To paraphrase or imitate the Psalms was a common undertaking in those days. La Ceppède's efforts may be likened to those of some of the best-known poets of the period, including his friend Malherbe (Psalm 146), the Castilian friar Luis de Léon (Psalm 130), and George Herbert (Psalm 23). The recitation of the seven penitential psalms (Psalms 6, 33, 38, 51, 102, 130, and 143) was then a popular Lenten practice, and La Ceppède's imitations, each accompanied with a lengthy prayer, succeed in expressing the sentiments of a contrite and humble heart. The work also included a number of other poems, including twelve sonnets that he offered in the hope that 'they would give some consolation to Christian souls amidst the numerous evils that they suffer' and as an advanced offering from a more ambitious task upon which he was already laboring, the Theorems upon the Sacred Mystery of Our Redemption."

When it was published in 1613, La Ceppède dedicated the first volume of the Theorems to the queen mother, Marie de Medici. He also sent a copy to Saint Francis de Sales, who had been a highly successful Catholic missionary among the French Protestants of the Chablais and who was then the Roman Catholic Bishop of overwhelmingly Calvinist Geneva. In response to La Ceppède's frequent comparison of Jesus Christ to figures from Greek and Roman mythology, the Bishop wrote, "[I am] drawn by that learned piety which so happily makes you transform the Pagan Muses into Christian ones."

When the second volume of the Theorems appeared in 1622, La Ceppède dedicated it to King Louis XIII, in celebration of both the King's recent coming of age and his military victory against an uprising of the Huguenots of Languedoc, which had been led by Henri, Duke of Rohan.

According to Christopher Blum, "The Theorems is not only poetry, it is a splendid work of erudition, as each sonnet is provided with a commentary linking it to scriptural and patristic sources and, especially, to the Summa Theologiae of St. Thomas Aquinas. The work bears the mark of the Renaissance: the sonnet, that choice mode of expressing romantic love, is here purged and elevated and put in the service of the epic tale of God's love for man. As de La Ceppède put it in his introduction—which can be read in Keith Bosley's admirable translation of seventy of the sonnets—the harlot Lady Poetry had been unstitched of 'her worldly habits' and shorn of her 'idolatrous, lying and lascivious hair' by the 'two-edged razor of profound meditation on the Passion and death of our Saviour.'"

== Personal life ==
La Ceppède married Madeleine de Brancas-Ceyreste, the daughter of Gaspard de Brancas-Forcalquier and Françoise d'Ancezune, and widow of Etienne de Mantin. The wedding took place on 30 April 1585. Their first daughter, Angélique, was born on 31 March 1587. She later married Henri de Simiane, Seigneur (or Lord) of La Coste. Their second daughter, Claire, was born on 13 March 1588. She would later become a nun with the Poor Clares.

He married a second time, with Anne de Faret, the daughter of Accurse de Faret, the Squire of Avignon, on 11 February 1611. The couple had no children.

== Death ==
La Ceppède died, loaded down with honors, at Avignon in July 1623. He is buried in Ayglades, under a statue of Mary Magdalene, subject of many of his best sonnets, in a grotto named for her within the church whose restoration he sponsored.

== Legacy ==
In the year following Jean de La Ceppède's death, Cardinal Richelieu became King Louis XIII's Minister of State and, largely through the influence of François de Malherbe, Baroque poetry was replaced by Neo-Classicism. To this day, the French poetry and literature of the Renaissance is often looked down on and Nicolas Boileau-Despréaux's maxim, Enfin Malherbe vint ("Finally Malherbe arrived"), continues to be taken for granted. La Ceppède's verses were accordingly consigned to oblivion until 1915, when they were unearthed by Fr. Henri Bremond and appeared in the first volume of his book Histoire littéraire du Sentiment religieux en France. Since then, La Ceppède's poetry has experienced a revival. It has appeared in multiple poetry anthologies and several scholarly works have been written about its author.

Malherbe himself admired La Ceppède's poetry, and wrote a sonnet to this effect, calling him "one of the first ornaments of our times." Among many testimonies in his private correspondence of his friendship with La Ceppède: "One of the principal considerations that brings me to Provence is the sweetness of [La Ceppède's] conversation." "His is a friendship I hold extremely dear and that I wish to conserve by all sorts of testimonies of my affection." La Ceppède is recalled after his death in a letter of Malherbe's in which the latter lists his departed friends.

Following his death in 1623, Jean de La Ceppède's former estate grew into a village called Les Aygalades, which is now part of the 15th arrondissement of Marseille. In 1689, part of the estate was purchased by the aristocratic de Guillermy family, who built upon it the Bastide de la Guillermy, which is now the oldest building in the city.
