= Clos de Villeneuve =

Coordinates: 43°49′56″N 5°58′40″E

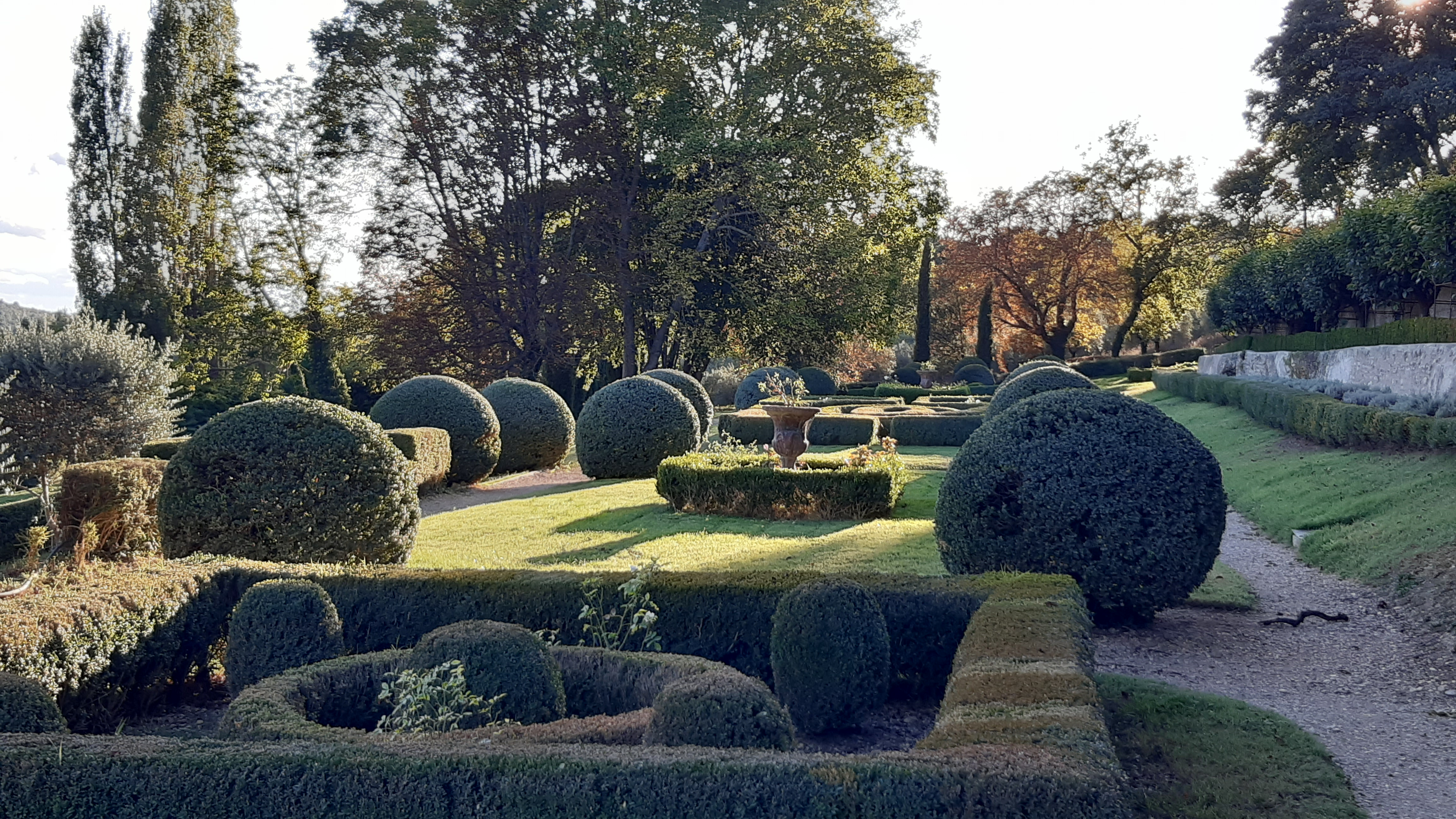
Gardens of Clos de Villeneuve.

The Clos de Villeneuve is a bastide, or Provençal private manor house, built in the 18th century, located in the commune of Valensole in the Department of Alpes-de-Haute-Provence in France. Its gardens were classified among the Remarkable Gardens of France by the French Ministry of Culture. It is no longer possible to arrange a visit.

The bastide was built in the first half of the 18th century by Jean-Baptiste de Villeneuve, the seigneur de Villeneuve, an old Provençal family. The gardens were created in the late 20th century by their present owner, the Comte Andre de Villeneuve Esclapon. They are laid out on three terraces with seven basins and fountains dating to the 18th and 19th centuries.
