= Bastide Bel-Air =

- Interactive map of Bastide Bel-Air
- Type: Manor house
- Location: Aix-en-Provence, France
- Coordinates: 43°33′29″N 5°27′30″E
- Built: 18th century

Monument historique
- Designated: 25 September 1980
- Reference no.: PA00080974

The Bastide Bel-Air is a historic bastide in Aix-en-Provence, France. It is located on the chemin des Platanes in the northern section of Aix-en-Provence, in southeastern France.

The bastide was built in the second half of the 18th century. It has been listed as an official historical monument by the French Ministry of Culture since 1980.
