= Palau del Marquès de Lió =

Coordinates: 41.3851°N 2.1809°E

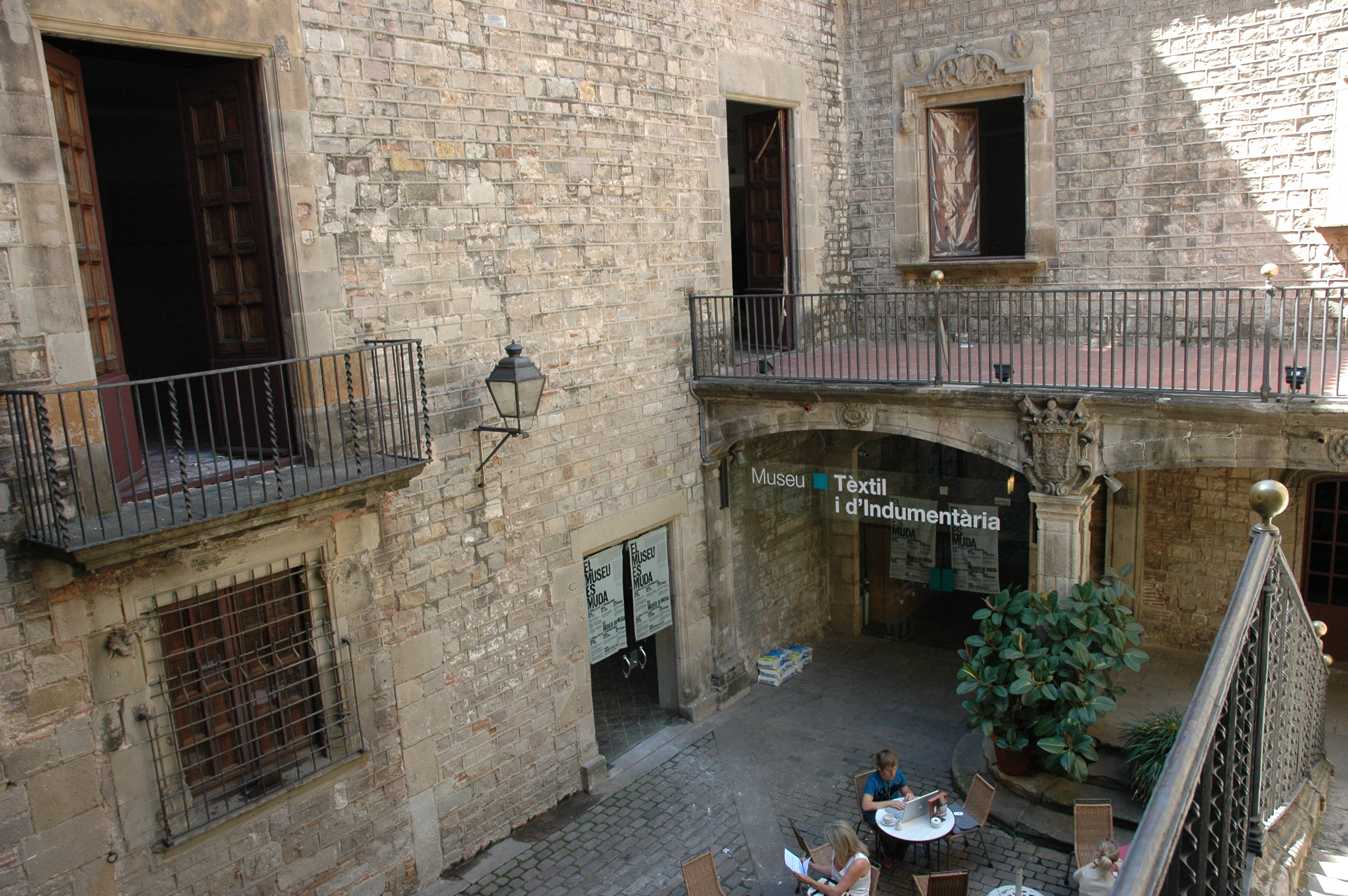
Inside courtyard

The Palau del Marquès de Lió is a civic building located at number 12 of Montcada street at the Barri de la Ribera district of Barcelona. Throughout its history has been the residence of several local noble families, among which the Marquès de Lió, which today gives its name to the building. It is one of the venues of the Disseny Hub Barcelona and hosts its temporary exhibitions.
