= Bastide de Repentance =

Coordinates: 43.5393°N 5.4785°E

- Interactive map of the Bastide de Repentance area

The Bastide de Repentance is a historic bastide in Aix-en-Provence, France.

== History ==
The bastide was built from 1657 to 1660.

== Architectural significance ==
It has been listed as an official historical monument by the French Ministry of Culture since 1984.
