= Design Museum of Barcelona =

Museum in Barcelona

Coordinates: 41°24′08″N 2°11′15″E

Museu del Disseny de Barcelona
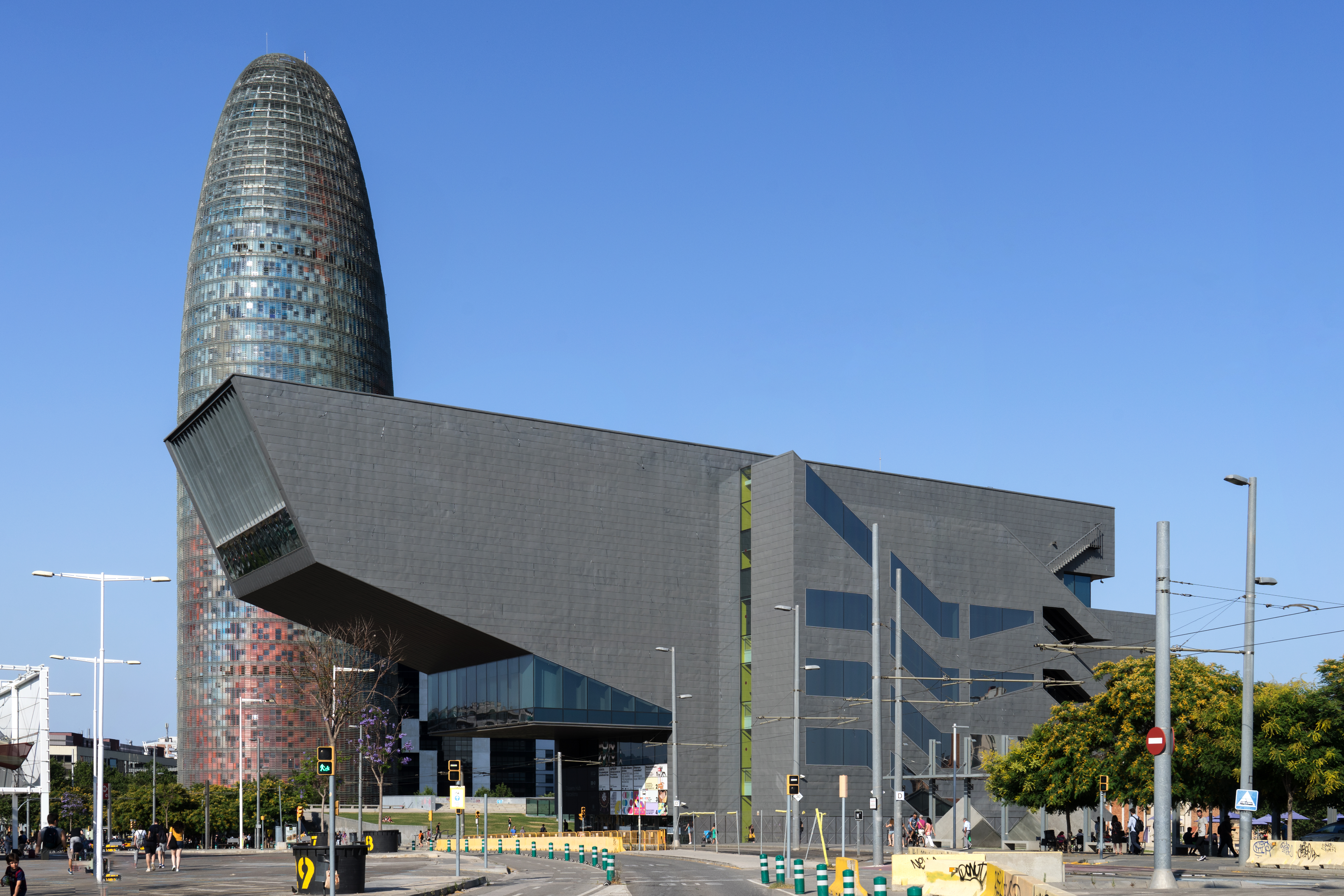
- Established: 2008
- Location: Barcelona, Spain
- Director: José Luis de Vicente
- Website: dissenyhub.barcelona/en

The Design Museum of Barcelona (Catalan: Museu del Disseny de Barcelona) is a center for Barcelona's Institute of Culture, which works to promote better understanding and good use of the design world, acting as a museum and laboratory. It focuses on 4 branches of design disciplines: space design, product design, information design and fashion.

The Museum is the result of the merging of several previous existing museums, such as the Museu de les Arts Decoratives, the Museu Tèxtil i d'Indumentària and the Gabinet de les Arts Gràfiques collection. The opening of the new headquarters, located on Plaça de les Glòries, next to Torre Agbar, was set gradually during 2014.

== History ==
Barcelona is a city historically linked to design, with old institutions such as the Foment de les Arts Decoratives. That is why the city of Barcelona was raised earlier in the decade of 2000 to create a single center, an integral space to allow the public to understand design in a broader consideration. It was decided to build a single unified space in Barcelona to house all collections and endowments related to the world of design. Oriol Bohigas commissioned the construction of a building in the Plaça de les Glòries for this purpose. It was originally going to be named Barcelona Design Museum, then from 2008 to 2013 it was named Design Hub Barcelona, but finally it was renamed again as Museu del Disseny de Barcelona (Design Museum of Barcelona).

== Building ==
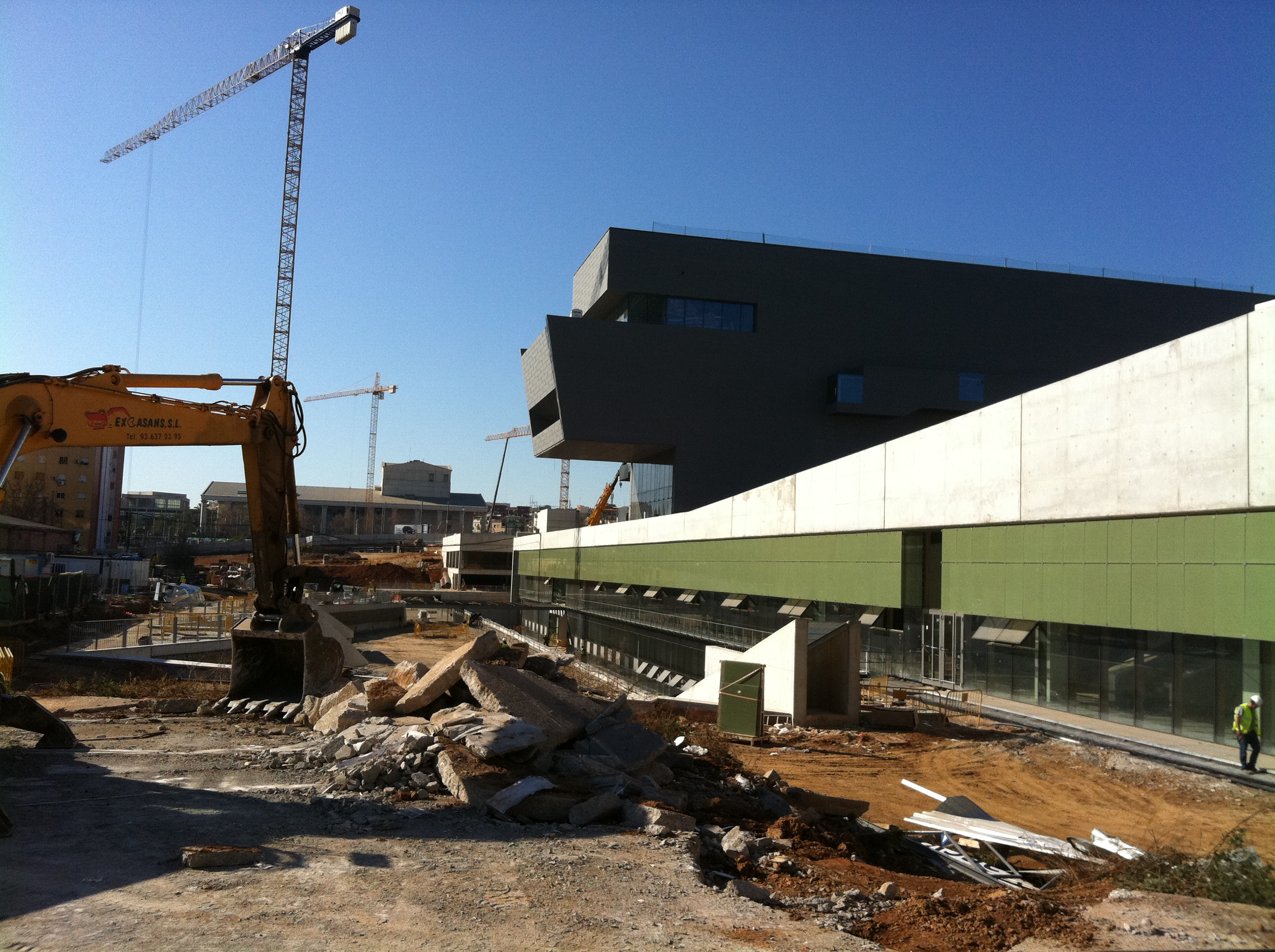
Streetworks related to the Glòries building

The Barcelona Design Museum is located at the DHUB building in the Plaça de les Glòries. It was designed by MBM architecture firm, formed by Oriol Martorell, Oriol Bohigas and David Mackay. The building construction started in July 2009, when the counselor of Culture Joan Manuel Tresserras and the mayor Jordi Hereu, laid the first stone. Construction ended in 2013, and the Design Museum of Barcelona opened its doors in 2014.

The building consists of two parts: one underground (using the level change caused by the urbanization of the Glories square) and another emerging 14.5 metres (48 ft) above ground. The latter is a parallelepiped bias cut with the same width as the Avila Street, acting as an indicator of the relationship between the Eixample streets and the Glòries square, without affecting the view of the large central park. The cover of the subway is a public space linked to the future project of the Plaça de les Glòries park. The green carpet is one of the important components and it is made with natural or artificial elements to ensure sustainability and easy maintenance. It includes a bar and restaurant.

=== Ground floor ===
Includes two floors and a mezzanine, denser activities, such as main exhibition hall, reservations, research and teaching, well-attended services, etc. Natural lighting and the relationship with the outside, despite being a basement, is achieved through the pit produced by the difference of levels, reinforced sheet water reflecting a kind of large forecourt. This lighting is reinforced with six skylights that emerge in the public and may be used as showcases for the contents and activities of the centre.

=== First floor ===
According to planning, it uses the minimum floor area in order not to reduce the space for public use. Cantilever extends into the square, allowing the planned building area. The set of the two bodies that make up the center enters through a single hall with double access: +7 m level., From Avila Street, and at +14.5 m., From the square. This hall is a kind of street or public place, public or semi-almost a must to relate the square of the Glories, the Poblenou and metro and the exchanger. From this square a set of stairs, escalators, and elevators reach all the services located in the basement and all the upper floors of various dimensions and characteristics, up to the conference room. The exterior of the building uses only two materials: metal plates (zinc or aluminum) and glass, so that, together, have an industrial look with metallic reflections.

=== Sustainability ===
The entire project involves a high degree of environmental quality, sustainability and energy sufficiency. It may indicate the most important chapters: passive sustainability (material and structure of massive facades and finestram, storage and processing, pre-engineered systems, shading and insulation, etc., Within the criteria of Distinctive Guarantee environmental quality of the Generalitat and the EU Ecolabel), sanitation (separative network to reuse rainwater), plumbing (minimum consumption control and regulation of flows, solar collectors for hot water production for a minimum of 70%), air conditioning (water chillers for air condensed high performance, low noise and acoustic protection, heat recovery chiller plants, natural gas boilers, free cooling when outdoor conditions permit, latent heat recovery in the extraction of air), electricity (low power, presence detectors, testers timed, photovoltaic panels for direct use of solar power), centralized management of all facilities.

== Museums ==
The Barcelona Design Museum is the result of merging several previously existing local museums:

=== Museu de les Arts Decoratives ===
The Museu de les Arts Decoratives was a museum created in 1932. This historic museum contains a rich and diverse collection of European decorative arts, from the Middle Ages to the Industrial Revolution. In 1995, the museum extended its boundaries with the incorporation of design, thus converting it into the first and only statewide museum concerned with the preservation and exhibition of Spanish industrial design. The collections of the Museu de les Arts Decoratives were created from an important resource of industrial design and decorative art objects, that included salvers, carriages, furniture, wallpaper, clocks, tapestries and glasswork.

=== Museu Tèxtil i d'Indumentària ===
The Museu Tèxtil i d'Indumentària possesses countless objects and pieces of major artistic and historical value that make up their collections of garments, fabrics and jewellery. Regarding their collection of clothes, the museum allows you to take a journey through the history of textiles, from the 16th century right up to the modern day. The museum's collections include Coptic, Hispano-Arab, Gothic and Renaissance fabrics, as well as embroidery, a section on lacework and a collection of prints. Also worth mentioning is the jewelry collection, comprising approximately five hundred pieces that were made and produced in Spain.

=== Gabinet de les Arts Gràfiques ===
The Gabinet de les Arts Gràfiques, a Cabinet of Graphic Arts, was a museum dedicated to visual communication design. The collections of the museum bring together significant samples of typography such as punches, matrices and tracing plates, as well as, prints that include samples of binding, packaging, labels and posters.

Important printers such as; Elzeviriana, Bobes, Seix Barral and Tobella, Naips Comas (the makers of playing cards), Tallers Roca (the industrial bookbinders) and the Neufville type foundry, have contributed to the museum's expanding resources. In addition, certain artists and their families, have also donated graphic works and engraving moulds – as is the case of Miquel Plana and the families of Josep Obiols and Miquel Llovet. The collection is presented during exhibitions and study galleries programmed by Disseny Hub Barcelona. The concept that initiated the Study Galleries was to create an area that combines the ideas of a temporary exhibition, a documentation centre and a museum repository but that has its own identity. Various objects are assembled according to their typologies and presented in a way that allows visitors to study, contemplate and reflect upon the museums collections.

=== The Casa Bloc Apartment Museum ===
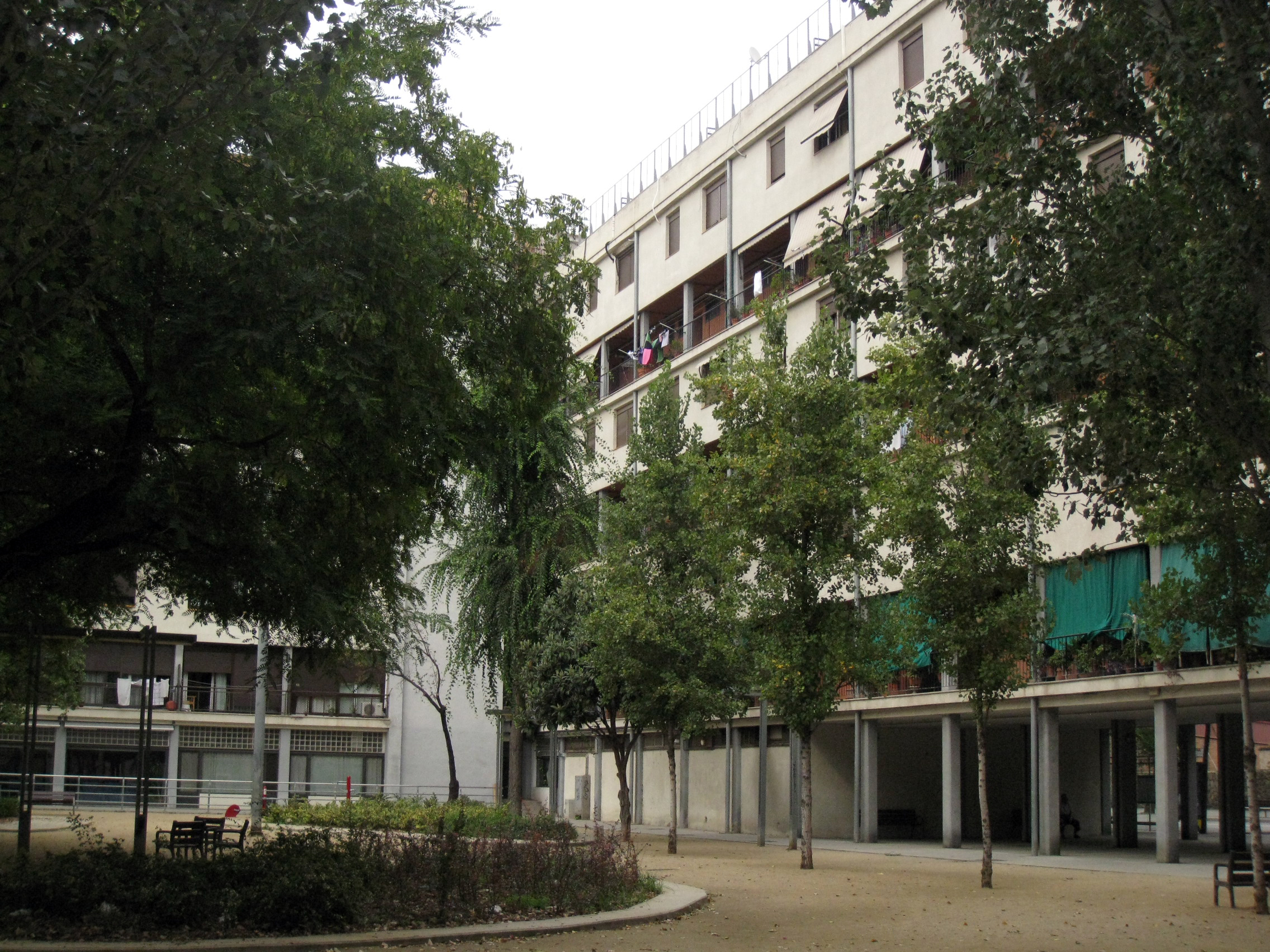
Casa Bloc

The Room 1/11 of the Casa Bloc (1932–1939) (in Catalan, Block house) is an apartment-museum run by the Design Museum of Barcelona. Inside you can visit the structure and the original look of the floor of this architectural complex, a reference architecture worker housing at the time of the Second Spanish Republic. The opening of this museum floor space as a tribute to the work of Josep Lluís Sert Josep Torres Clavé and Joan Baptista Subirana and innovation that its approach assumed the 1930s. The Casa Bloc is open to everyone, with a regime of guided tours by reservation, from March 2012. Room 1/11 is a duplex measuring 60 square meters. It is located in Block 2, Level 1, Gate 11. The internal layout is very simple and clearly differentiates the day and the night.

== Documentation center ==
The Museum also hosts a library dedicated to the greater areas in the world of design: product, fashion, information and interior design. The initial bibliographic reserves contains over 9,000 published documents dating from the 16th century to the present day, as well as 1,600 of those dating from before 1950. The reserve originated in the old libraries of the Museus Tèxtil i d'Indumentària de Barcelona and the Museu d'Arts Decoratives de Barcelona, the Gabinet de les Arts Gràfiques de Barcelona and the BCD (Barcelona Centre de Disseny). These sources have received numerous donations over the years by professionals, individuals, institutions and businesses. Particularly noteworthy for their uniqueness and excellent state of preservation, the bibliographic reserves of the Museu Tèxtil i d'Indumentària are made up largely of two very large donations: the bequest of the Comtesa de Vilardaga and the donation by Sr. Manuel Rocamora. The majority of the bibliographic reserves can be found in the reading room and are accessible to the public. It has developed its own classification system: IMAG.

The most valuable documents, the oldest and those that are referred to the least, can be found in a deposit in the DHUB building. The Documentation center uses RFID technology (Radio Frequency Identification) to keep track of the number of consults each document receives. With this information, the documents that are the most in demand are always located in the reading room for ease of access.

The historic reserves of magazines and journals are still being catalogued. The centre keeps over 100 subscriptions to specialist magazines and journals.

=== Archives ===
The archives of the documentation center currently include:

- ADI FAD Archive. Collection of the reserves of the Associació de Dissenyadors Industrials del Foment de les Arts Decoratives (1957–2007) It contents documentation generated by the association in its everyday activities, being of work or management. Includes documentation related to its administration (foundational acts, meetings, members, reports, participation in international entities...), information management (archives, computer system...), external relations (public acts, relations with other private and public institutions...), human resources management, financial resources management, heritage management (movable and real state items), legal issues, promotion of industrial design (exhibitions, conferences, publications...) and services to the members (distribution lists, labour exchange, bulletins...).
- Rigalt i Granell Archive. The Archive is made up of documents collected from the stained-glass workshop Rigalt, Granell & Cia and is a testimony to the work of this centenarian workshop that was in operation from 1890 until 1984. Until now, the documentation from the stained-glass workshop Rigalt, Granell & Cia. was being preserved by the Granell family. The archive consists of diverse information about the artistic and technical aspects of the workshop whose work was central to the modernist period. Their work can be found at the Palau de la Música Catalana, the Hospital de la Santa Creu i Sant Pau and the Casa Lleó Morera, among others. The company worked with architects including Lluís Domènech i Montaner, Lluís Moncunill, Josep Puig i Cadafalch and Geroni Granell. The documentation is a testimony to the work of this centenarian workshop that was in operation from 1890 until 1984. Rigalt, Granell & Cia. faced many challenges throughout this period, which, while it always remained in the hands of the Granell family, included changes to its founding members. In this archive you can find accounting documents, drawings, sketches, inventories, publicity catalogues and photos from the stained-glass workshop. The largest number of documents that have been preserved are 500 sketches that include drawings of stained-glass and acid-etched glass. Thanks to these drawings, we can follow the artistic trends in stained-glass over the last 100 years. Included are drawings from the pre-modernist, modernist, noucentista, art deco, and works that reflect the abstract tendencies of the 80s. The donation comprises a total of 3,000 pieces, including prints (from different countries), diverse themed plates, brochures, business directories (among which include Les Vitraux de Paris (c.1900), Aus der Deutschen Glasmalerei de Berlin (1901) and Religiöse Malerein für Kirchedekoration de Viena (1907), company photographs and folders with original drawings and sketches.
- Montaner y Simón editors collection.

=== Databases ===
It provides users with access to specialized databases. Requests and consultations should be made at the centre's facilities.

- Design and Applied Arts Index (DAAI) allows for the consultation of summaries of published articles from design publications dating back to 1973. It covers a wide variety of disciplines: Ceramics, glass, furniture, jewelry, graphic design, fashion design, textile design, interior design, architecture, web design, etc. It includes approximately 1200 new records every month.
- Berg Fashion Library is an online resource that provides integrated access to visual and textual content on clothing and fashion throughout history. It includes the Berg Encyclopedia of World Dress and Fashion, a collection of electronic books, dictionaries and other reference resources, as well as, an extensive image bank.

== See also ==
- List of design museums
- Pilar Vélez Vicente
