= Mas (Mediterranean farmhouse) =

Traditional farmhouse in France, Catalonia, and Aragon

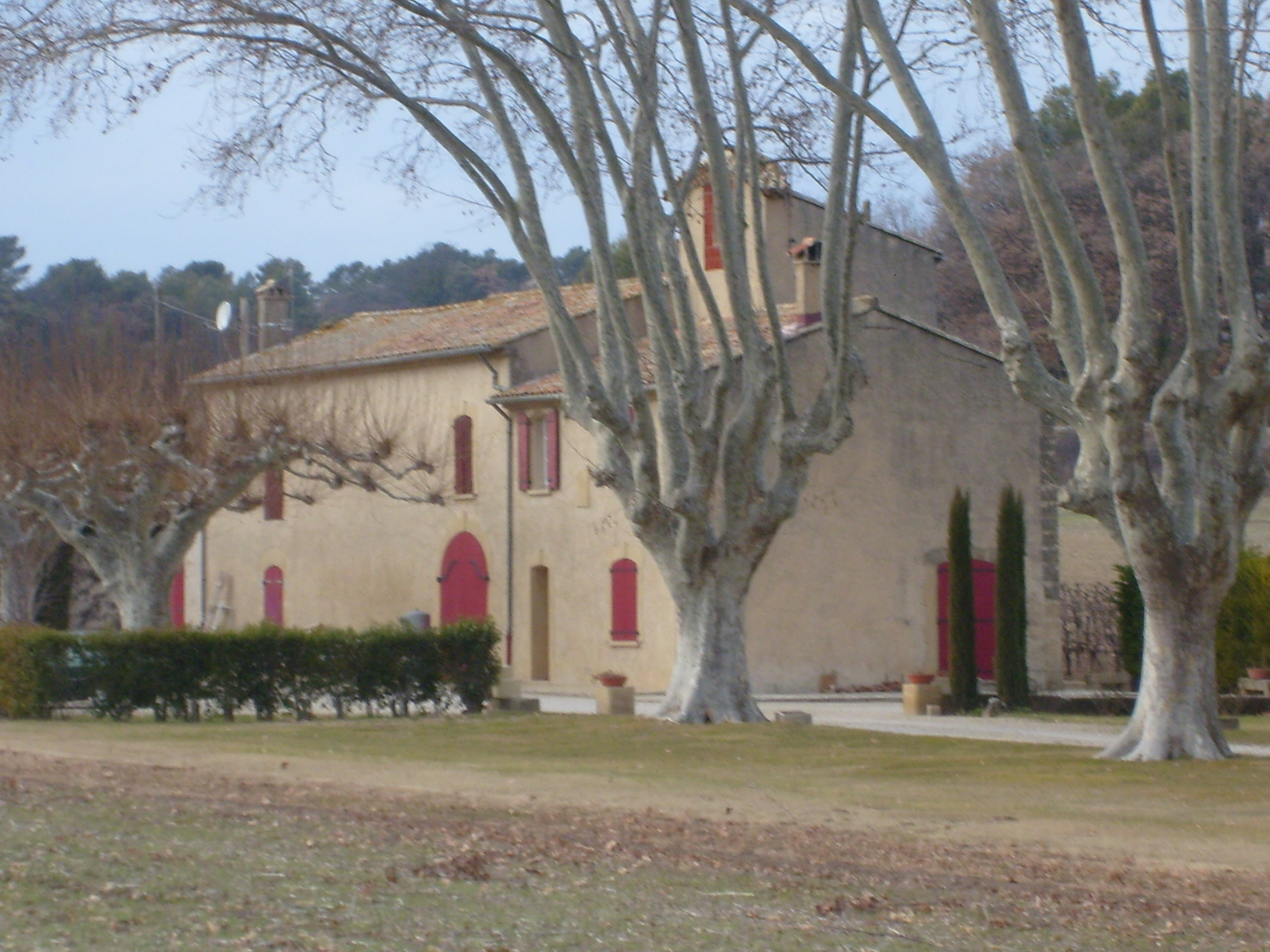
A mas near Rognes north of Aix-en-Provence

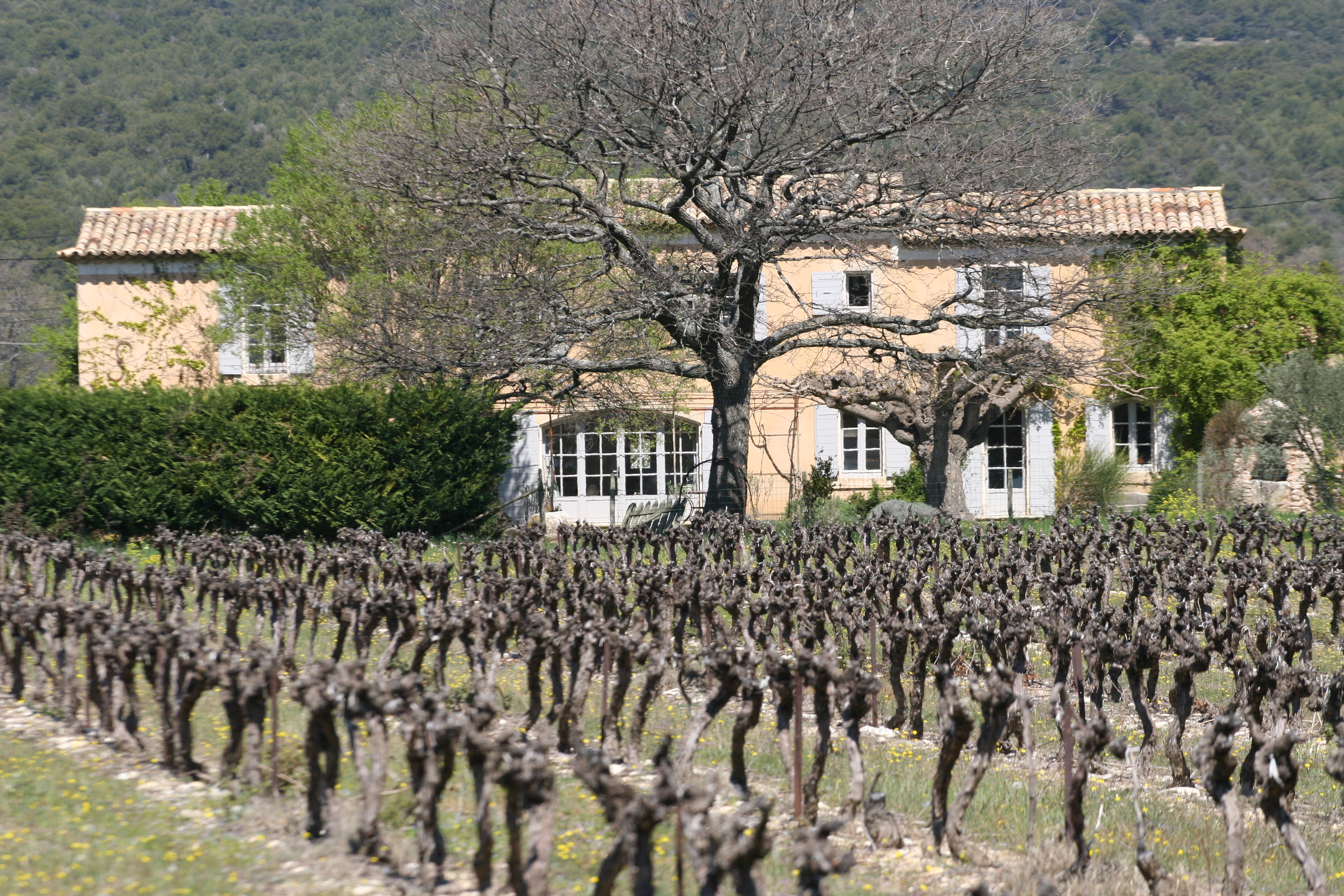
Mas in the Luberon region

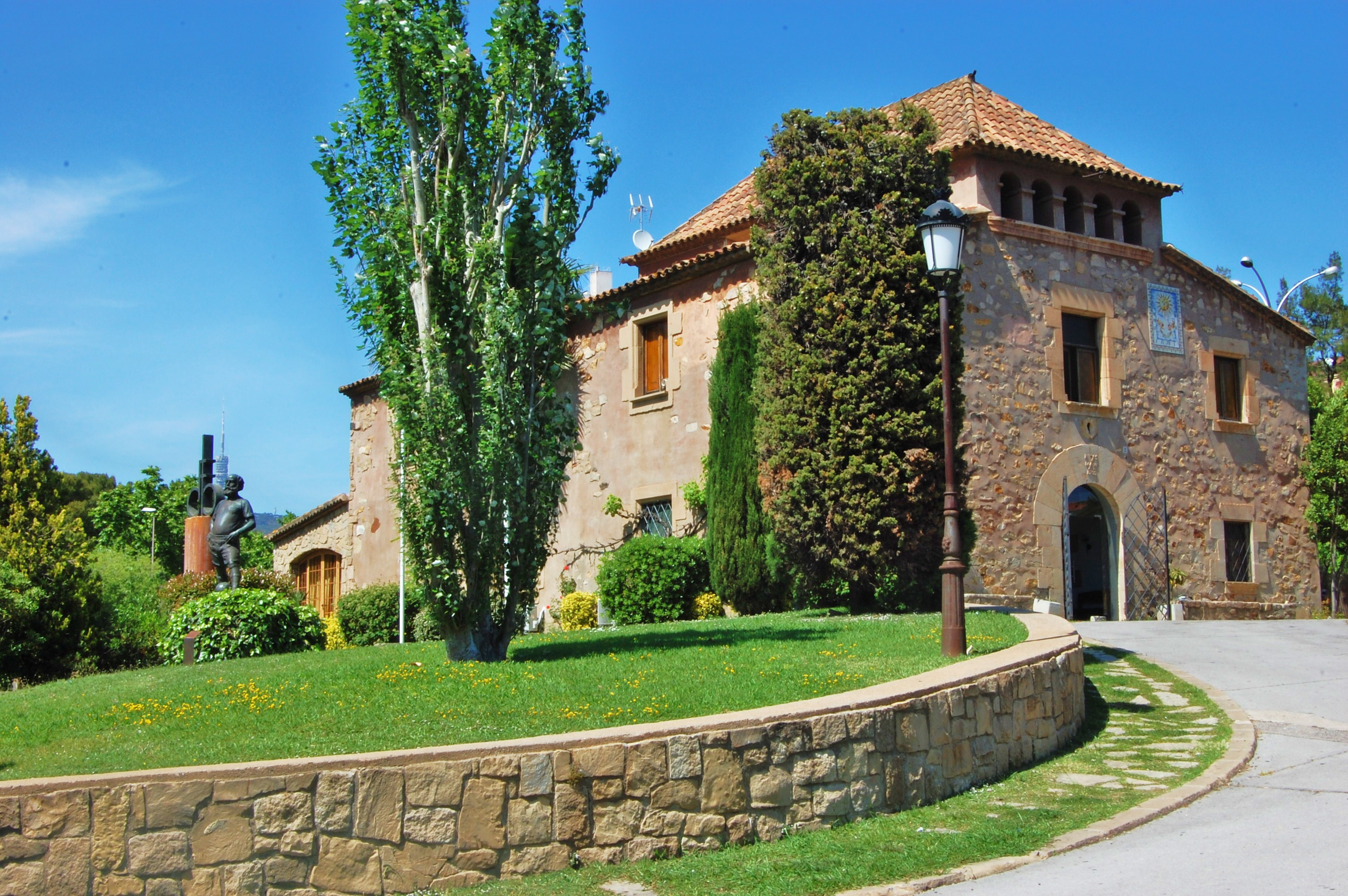
La Masia de Can Planes in Barcelona

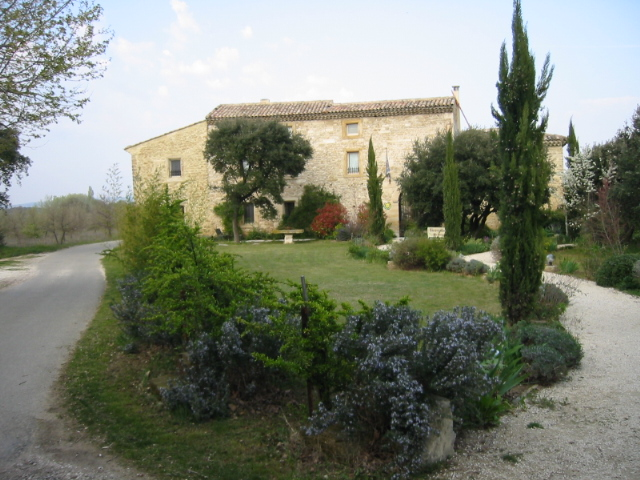
Mas in the Drôme department

A mas (Occitan: [ˈmas], Catalan: [ˈmas]) in the Provence and Midi; masia (Catalan pronunciation: [maˈzia], Sardinian pronunciation: [maˈzia]) in Catalonia, Balearic Islands, the Land of Valencia and Sardinia; or masía (Spanish pronunciation: [maˈsia]) in Aragon is a traditional farmhouse.

== Description ==
A mas was the centre of a largely self-sufficient economic unit, which could produce its own fruit, vegetables, grain, milk, meat and even silkworms. It was constructed of local stone, with the kitchen and room for animals on the ground floor, and bedrooms, storage places for food and often a room for raising silkworms on the upper floor. Not every farmhouse in Provence is a mas. A mas was distinct from the other traditional kind of house in Provence, the bastide, which was the home of a wealthy family.

The mas of Provence and Catalonia always faces to the south to offer protection against the mistral wind coming from the north. Also because of the mistral, there are no windows facing north, and on all the other sides, windows are narrow to protect against the heat of summer and the cold of winter. A mas is almost always rectangular, with two sloping roofs. The mas found in the mountains and in the Camargue sometimes has a more complex shape.

In Catalonia, the tenant of a mas is called a masover (pronounced [məzuˈβe]), as different from the real landowner.

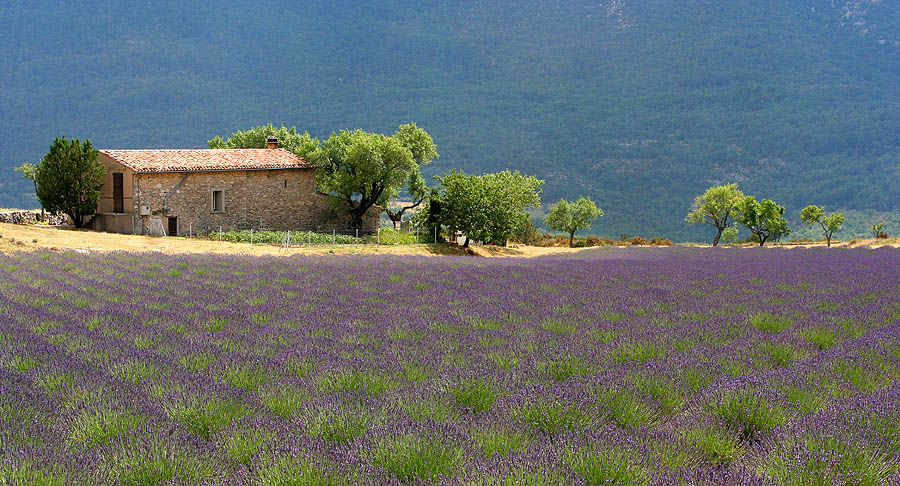
A mazet, a small mas

Among the different kinds of mas in Provence, there are two characteristic types:

The mas of Luberon has the form of a long rectangle, or sometimes an L shape. A stairway, often in the centre, leads to a corridor on the upper floor, usually on the north side of the house, which opens onto the bedrooms. The upper floor also has space for storing forage for the animals and grain, and for the raising of silkworms. The room where the silkworms were raised (see sericulture) was called the magnanerie.

The mas of the Camargue is strongly influenced by the climate and the environment, and resembles a Spanish hacienda, with large spaces, white walls, an interior court and buildings in the form of a U for the residence and stables.

The size of a mas depended upon the wealth and number of its original occupants: from 150 square metres to over 1,000 square meters, including the barn and other structures. As the family grew larger the mas would be made longer to accommodate them. When a mas is small, and is occupied by a single family with a small area of land, it is called a mazet, or petit mas (alternatively, maset in Catalan).

The mas was always built of inexpensive local materials; stones or wood from the area. The walls of the mas along the River Durance were made from river stones; those of Gordes of limestone, and those of Roussillon (Rosselló in Catalan) and the rest of Catalonia of red stones and clay.

In recent years the traditional mas of Provence and Catalonia have become much sought after and transformed into expensive homes and vacation homes (résidences secondaires in France, or cases de turisme rural in Catalonia).

== See also ==
- Ansitz
- Masia
- Longère

== Bibliography ==
- Livet, Roger, Habitat rural et structures agraires en Basse-Provence (in French)
- Massot, Jean-Luc, Maisons rurales et vie paysanne en Provence (in French)
- Borbonet i Macià, Anna, Masies que cal conèixer (in Catalan)
