= Enrique García =

Enrique García may refer to:

== Academia ==
- Enrique García-Berro (1959–2017), Spanish astrophysicist
- Enrique García Hernán (born 1964), Spanish historian

== Arts and entertainment ==
- Enrique García Álvarez (playwright) (1873–1931), Spanish playwright and composer
- Enrique García-Godoy (1886–1947), Dominican painter and journalist
- Enrique García Álvarez (actor) (1896–1971), Spanish-Mexican actor
- Enrique García Asensio (born 1937), Spanish violinist, composer and conductor
- Enrique García-Máiquez (born 1969), Spanish poet

== Law and politics ==
- Enrique García-Huidobro (fl. 1900s), Chilean politician
- Enrique García-Ramal (1914–1987), Spanish politician
- Tet Garcia (Enrique Garcia Jr., 1940–2016), Filipino politician
- Enrique Burgos García (born 1946), Mexican politician

== Sports ==
- Enrique García (Argentine footballer) (1912–1969)
- Enrique García (gymnast) (born 1943), Mexican gymnast
- Enrique García Ojeda (born 1972), Spanish rally driver
- Kike García (Venezuelan footballer) (Enrique García Feijoó, born 1982)
- Kike García (Spanish footballer) (Enrique García Martínez, born 1989)
