= Álvaro de la Quadra =

Spanish churchman and diplomat

- Bishop of L'Aquila
- Church: Catholic Church
- Diocese: Diocese of L'Aquila
- In office: 13 September 1553 – 1561
- Predecessor: Bernardo Sancio
- Successor: Juan de Acuña
- Previous post: Bishop of Venosa (1542-1551)

Personal details
- Born: 1516 Naples, Kingdom of Naples, Crown of Aragon
- Died: 1563 (aged 46–47) London, Kingdom of England

Álvaro de la Quadra (Naples, 1500-1510 – London, 1564) was a Spanish churchman and diplomat. He was Prelate and Ambassador to England during Elizabeth I of England reign. He was also Bishop of Venosa and of L'Aquila, and attended the Council of Trent.

== Biography ==
He was born in Naples between 1500 and 1510.
He was a descendant of Iñigo López de la Cuadra, who met Ferdinand the Catholic in 1476 on his visit to Vizcaya and captained his personal bodyguard, saving his life in an assassination attempt. His relatives also included Pedro de la Quadra (secretary to Isabella of Portugal) and Juan López de la Quadra (who taught Charles V's children Isabel and John).

Born in Naples, he was Bishop of Venosa in Italy between 1542 and 1551. At the request of Emperor Charles V, he also became bishop of Aquila in 1553. He entered in the service of King Philip II of Spain in 1558 who entrusted him with the delicate mission of asking the Emperor Ferdinand I for the Vicariate of the Empire.

Later he was sent to London to bring to the Count of Feria, at that time Philip II's ambassador in England, instructions on how the succession in this Kingdom was to be carried out after the death of Queen Mary Tudor and on the wedding of the new Queen Elizabeth I. Álvaro de la Quadra remained in England as first secretary to Ambassador Feria, thus learning the ins and outs of English politics. In May 1559 he succeeded Feria as ambassador in this Kingdom.

Among the many activities his mission required, Quadra had to support the Catholics in England. He also had to defend Spanish trade from English privateers and act as an intermediary to select for Queen Elizabeth a suitor who met the necessary requirements for the Spanish monarch, that is, that he was a good Catholic and exerted a positive influence over the Queen towards an alliance with Spain.

According to Enrique García Hernán, on 9 January 1563, the Irish Chief Shane O’Neill, in rebellion against Elizabeth I, requested Spanish military assistance through Quadra, then Spanish Ambassador in London. Although O'Neill received a negative answer, Elizabeth I asked Madrid to recall Quadra. This leads to believe that Quadra, who died of the plague in England before he could return home, provided some support to O’Neill (probably money) or had done so in the past.

De la Quadra was depicted by James Frain in the 1998 film Elizabeth.

== External links and additional sources ==
- Cheney, David M. "Archdiocese of L'Aquila". Catholic-Hierarchy.org. (for Chronology of Bishops)^{self-published}
- Chow, Gabriel. "Metropolitan Archdiocese of L'Aquila". GCatholic.org. (for Chronology of Bishops)^{self-published}
