= Carles Feixa Pàmpols =

Spanish anthropologist

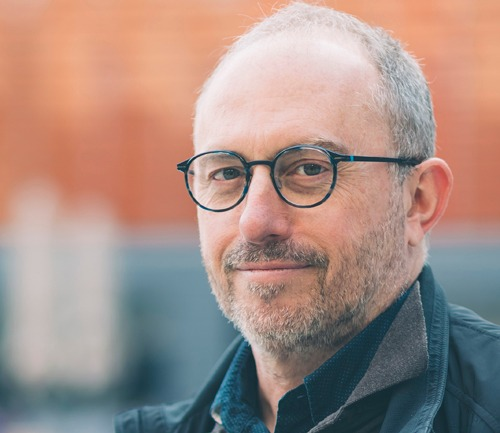
- Occupations: Anthropologist and academic

Academic background
- Education: B.S., Geography and History; M.S., Social Anthropology; Ph.D., Social Anthropology
- Alma mater: University of Barcelona; University of Rome

Carles Feixa Pàmpols is an anthropologist and an academic. He is a professor of Social Anthropology at Pompeu Fabra University.

Feixa's research has been focused on youth cultures. He is the author of different books on the subject, including De jóvenes, bandas y tribus, Global Youth?: Hybrid Identities, Plural Worlds, La imaginación autobiográfica, and Mierdas punk: La banda que revolucionó el punk mexicano.

In 2017, he received the ICREA Academia award from the Generalitat de Catalunya.

== Education ==
Feixa graduated from the University of Barcelona in 1985 with a BS degree in Geography and History. Later, in 1990, he obtained a Ph.D. in Social Anthropology from the same institution.

== Career ==
Feixa began his career as a doctoral fellow at the University of Barcelona from 1986 to 1988. Between 1988 and 1992, he was appointed as an assistant professor at the same institute. He was then promoted to associate professor in 1992. He then joined the University of Lleida, where he was an associate professor from 1992 to 2011. He became a full professor at the University of Lleida in 2011. Following this appointment, he became a full professor at Pompeu Fabra University.

Feixa has been an advisor on youth policy and migration for the United Nations. In 2024, he coordinated the Informe Juventud en España 2024 for the Spanish Youth Institute, which is a part of the Ministry of Youth and Childhood.

== Works ==
In 1998, Feixa published De jóvenes, bandas y tribus: Antropología de la juventud, which was a study on contemporary youth styles and provided a cross-cultural and historical overview of the concept of youth. The book also included findings from his studies on youth gangs in Catalonia and Mexico. In Juvenopedia: Mapeo de las juventudes iberoamericanas, he conceptualized the world of Ibero-American youth to explain these youth identities. Ana Martínez reviewed it as a great collective work showcasing the realities affecting young people in Latin America. In La imaginación autobiográfica: Las historias de vida como herramienta de investigación, he provided a collection of life stories of different youth nationalities in order to construct youth identity within social systems. Julia Preciado commended the book for its contribution to the autobiographical and dialogical imagination of constructing the life stories of youth. However, Cecilia Mayer criticized it for failing to explain how the autobiographical process transformed the author personally.

In 2020, Feixa published El Rey: Diario de un Latin King, which was a chronicle of the life of César Andrade who was also known as King Manaba, former leader of the Latin Kings. Dennis Rodgers, in his review, observed that the book underplayed the author's perspective on the Latin Kings and did not include a critical, self-reflective account of their relationship. His interactions with Francisco Valle, or El Iti, are detailed in Mierdas punk: La banda que revolucionó el punk mexicano, which also functions as an origin story for Mierdas Punk, an anti-establishment band.

In De la Generación@ a la #Generación: La juventud en la era digital, Feixa detailed the challenges faced by young people in the digital age, highlighting the role of youth culture and global society. Claudia Cabello praised the book as a "meticulous" and "profound" account on generational change in the digital age. In Global Youth? : Hybrid Identities, Plural Worlds, which he co-authored with Pam Nilan, he analyzed local youth cultures in the context of consumption trends and global mass media. The book was commended for its accessiblity and coherence, although it was criticized for lacking a systematic analysis on how class, status, and power impact youth identity, as well as for being "weak at ethnographic data".

Feixa has worked on the coordination of the Informe Juventud en España 2024: Entre la emergencia y la resiliencia, a report published every four years about the situation of young people in Spain.

== Awards and honors ==
- 2006 – Doctorate Honoris Causa, University of Manizales
- 2017 – ICREA Academia award, Generalitat de Catalunya
- 2017 – Advanced grant, European Research Council

== Selected books ==
- Feixa, Carles (1998). De jóvenes, bandas y tribus: Antropología de la juventud (1st ed.). Ariel. ISBN 978-8434411760.
- Nilan, Pam; Feixa, Carles, eds. (2006). Global youth? Hybrid Identities, Plural Worlds. London; New York: Routledge. ISBN 978-0415370714.
- Feixa, Carles (2014). De la Generación@ a la #Generación: La juventud en la era digital (1st ed.). Barcelona: Ned Ediciones. ISBN 978-8494236464.
- Feixa, Carles; Leccardi, Carmen; Nilan, Pam (2016). Youth, Space and Time: Agoras and Chronotopes in the Global City. Brill. ISBN 978-9004225831.
- Feixa, Carles (2018). La imaginación autobiográfica: Las historias de vida como herramienta de investigación (1st ed.). Gedisa. ISBN 978-8417341503.
- Feixa, Carles (2020). El Rey. Diario de un Latin King (1st ed.). Ned Ediciones. ISBN 978-8416737857.
- Feixa, Carles; Valle, Francisco (2023). Mierdas punk (1st ed.). Ned Ediciones. ISBN 978-8418273292.
