= Anna Perdrix Rosell =

- Education: University of Barcelona; King's College London; Francis Crick Institute
- Known for: Developmental biology, Organoids
- Awards: Future Leaders in Cancer Research Prize, Cancer Research UK
- Scientific career
- Fields: Drug delivery, Tumour growth
- Workplaces: Sixfold Bioscience; King's College London; Francis Crick Institute

Anna Perdrix Rosell is a Spanish scientist who completed her PhD in cancer cell signalling at the Francis Crick Institute in London. She co-founded a biotech start-up, which helped her get onto the Forbes 30 under 30 list in 2018.

== Early life and education ==
Perdrix Rosell grew up in Northern Spain, where she first learned to operate a microscope at the age of 5. Her father owned a company developing pest control methods for agriculture and he and Perdrix Rosell would collect samples to analyse together.

Perdrix Rosell is studying for a PhD in Ilaria Malanchi's lab at the Francis Crick Institute in London and Victoria Sanz-Moreno's lab at King's College London. She studies how cancer cells can signal to other cells around it in the tumour microenvironment, which could potentially help a tumour grow.

== Research and career ==
In the second year of her PhD, Perdrix Rosell co-founded a biotech start-up, Sixfold Bioscience, alongside fellow PhD student George Foot and Zuzanna Brzosko, who completed her PhD neuroscience from the University of Cambridge. The company aims to improve the way gene therapies are delivered to cancer cells, using RNA nanotechnology. They use customizable RNA nanoparticles to get drugs into tumours, without harming nearby healthy cells.

Perdrix Rosell said she started the company because "we wanted to build something to deliver cancer drugs only to diseased cells – minimising side effects and increasing the drugs' efficacy." The co-founders moved to the US for 3 months at the beginning of 2018 to take the company through the top US accelerator programme, Y Combinator. Sixfold Bioscience secured seed funding from Silicon Valley investors and was short-listed for the first Accelerate@Babraham start-up competition in July 2018.

Perdrix Rosell was picked as the rising star of 2019 in science by The Observer. She also made it onto Forbes 30 under 30 list for European science and healthcare in 2018. She was also named 100 Women Founder in Europe to follow on Twitter and LinkedIn.
