= Joan Guàrdia =

Joan Guàrdia i Olmos
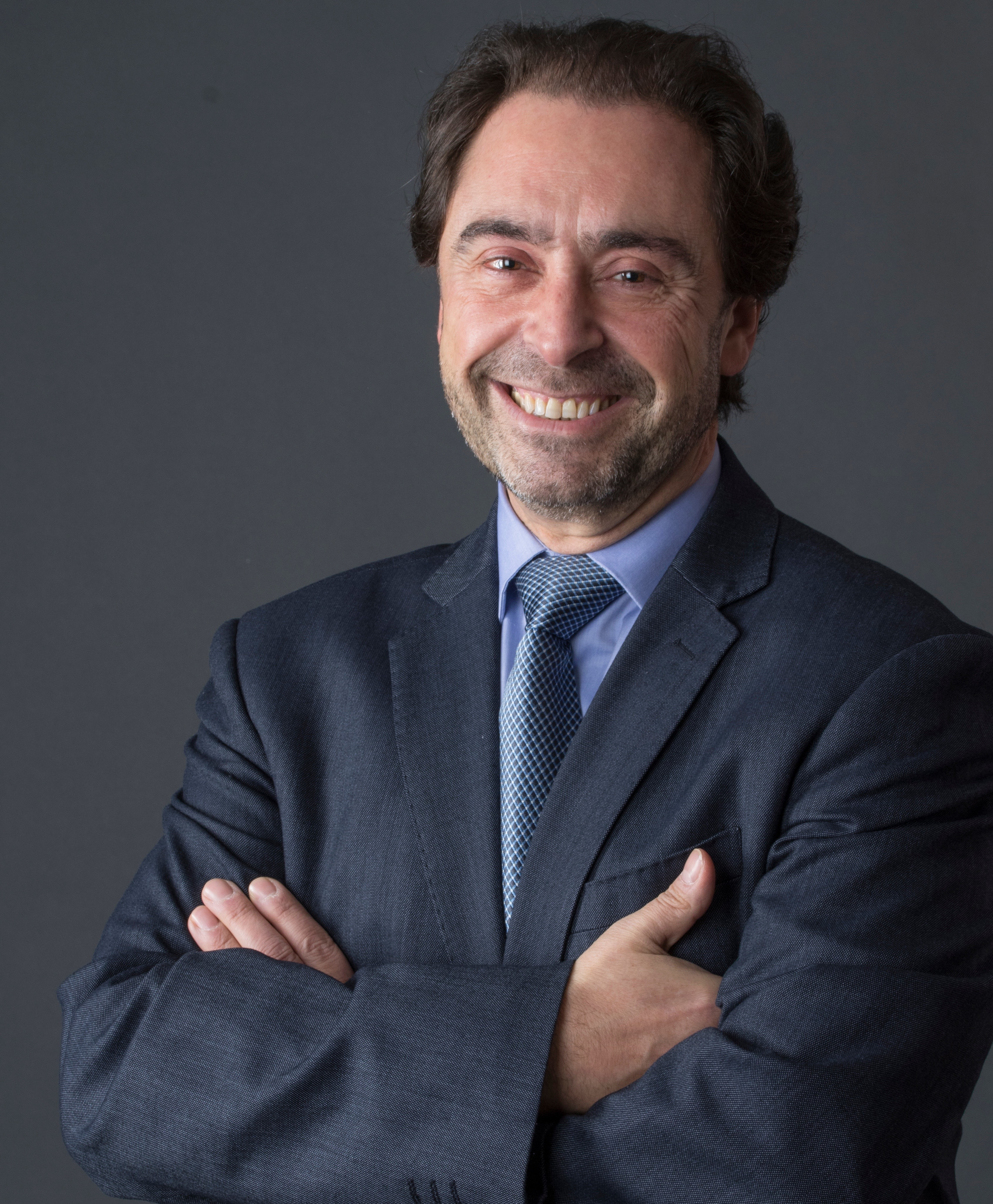
- Joan Guàrdia in 2020
- Born: 1958 (age 67–68); Barcelona
- Occupation: Full professor
- Known for: Rector of the University of Barcelona (2020–)

Joan Guàrdia i Olmos (Barcelona, 1958) is a full professor of psychology at the University of Barcelona, and the 48th Rector of the university since December 2020. In December 2023 he was reelected rector of the University of Barcelona.

He is a professor of Behavioral Sciences Methodology at the Faculty of Psychology. He arrived at the University of Barcelona as a student of the Faculty of Economic Sciences and combined these studies with those of Psychology, which he finished in 1985. Doctor in Psychology from the same university, he completed postgraduate studies at the University of Essex (UK) in 1989.

An expert in statistics and the systematic study of human behavior, he has taught in the Faculty of Psychology, but also in Pharmacy, Economics and Business, Geography and History, Nursing, Education and Biology.

He has published several books, more than 200 scientific articles, and led more than 20 doctoral theses.
