= University of Barcelona =

Public university in Barcelona, Catalonia, Spain

Coordinates: 41°23′12″N 2°09′50″E

- Universitat de Barcelona
- Coat of arms of the university
- Motto: Libertas perfundet omnia luce (Freedom bathes everything with light)
- Type: Public
- Established: 3 November 1450; 575 years ago
- Affiliations: Coimbra Group; LERU; European University Association; Mediterranean Universities Union; International Research Universities Network; Vives Network; Sino-Spanish University Alliance (SSU)
- Rector: Joan Guàrdia
- Administrative staff: 5,715
- Students: 62,995
- Location: Barcelona, Catalonia, Spain
- Campus: 4 with 16 faculties and 9 affiliated centres
- Language: Catalan
- Colours: Sky blue
- Website: ub.edu
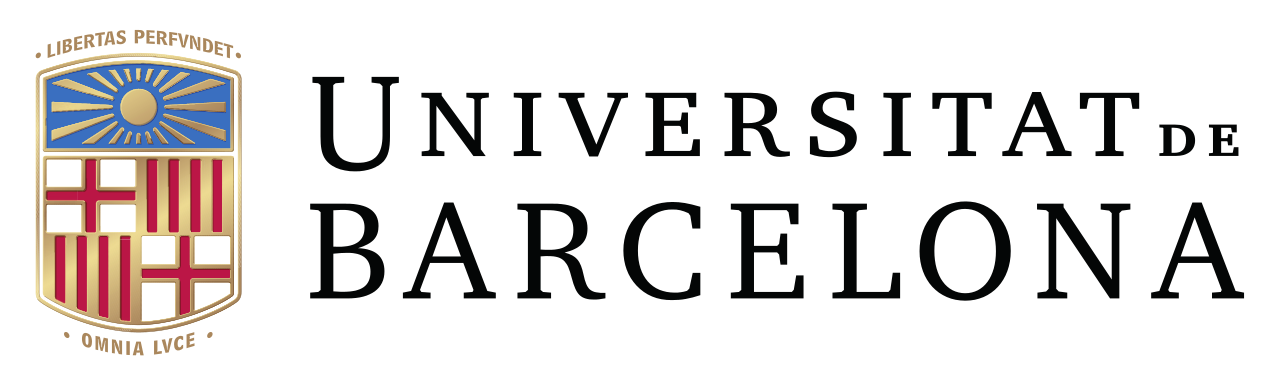

The University of Barcelona (UB; Catalan: Universitat de Barcelona, Catalan pronunciation: [uniβəɾsiˈtad də βəɾsəˈlonə]) is a public university), formerly also known as Central University of Barcelona is a public research university located in the city of Barcelona, Catalonia, Spain. It was established in 1450. With 76,000 students, it is one of the biggest universities in Spain and has also been ranked 1st in the country in most of the 2025 rankings.

It has 106 departments and more than 5,000 full-time researchers, technicians and research assistants, most of whom work in the 243 research groups as recognized and supported by the Government of Catalonia. In 2010, the UB was awarded 175 national research grants and 17 European grants and participated in over 500 joint research projects with the business sector, generating an overall research income of 70 million euros. The work of these groups is overseen by the UB's research centres and institutes which collaborate with leading research institutions and networks in Spain and abroad. The UB is also home to three large research foundations: the Barcelona Science Park Foundation (PCB), which includes the Institute of Biomedical Research of Barcelona (IRBB); the August Pi i Sunyer Biomedical Research Institute (IDIBAPS); and the Bellvitge Institute for Biomedical Research (IDIBELL). The UB is also a degree-awarding body of the Institut Barcelona d'Estudis Internacionals (IBEI).

== History ==
=== Founding ===
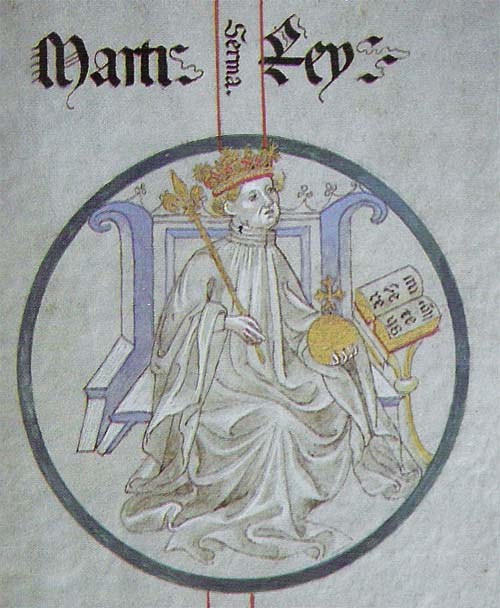
In 1401, Martí of Aragon founded the Estudi General, precursor to the University of Barcelona

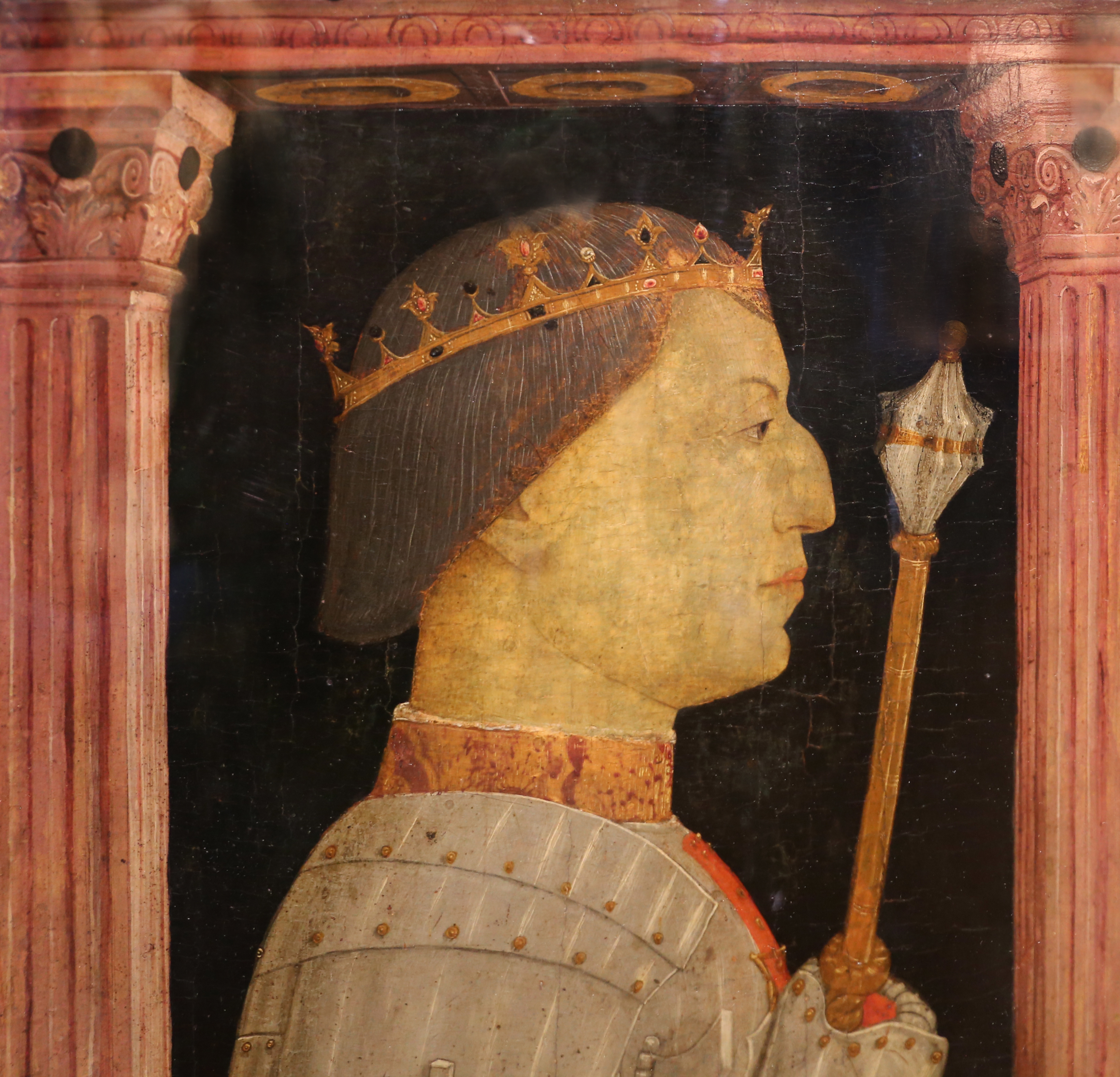
In 1450, Alfons el Magnànim founded the University of Barcelona

The university was founded under the royal prerogative granted by King Alfons el Magnànim on 3 November 1450. For forty-nine years prior to this, however, the city had a fledgling medical school (or Estudi General, as the universities were known at that time), founded by King Martí of Aragon, but neither the Consell de Cent (Barcelona's Council of One Hundred) nor the city's other leading institutions had given it their official recognition, considering it an intrusion on their respective jurisdictions. Alfons el Magnànim's prerogative, though, was granted at the petition of the Consell de Cent, and so the council was always to consider the Estudi General created in 1450 as the city's true university, since it was very much under its control and patronage.

The process that culminated in the foundation of the Estudi General of Barcelona can be traced back to the end of the fourteenth century, with the opening of a number of schools under the patronage of the City Hall, the cathedral schools and the Dominican convent of Santa Caterina, which established itself as a major cultural centre. It was King Martí the Humane who set in motion the process that would result in the foundation of the University of Barcelona. In his letter written 23 January 1398, and addressed to the councillors of Barcelona, he informed them that he had sought the Pope's permission to found a university in the city.

Despite the Consell de Cent's refusal to accept the concession issued by the King to found an Estudi General, on 10 January 1401, Martí founded the Estudi General of Medicine in Barcelona under his royal prerogative, granting it the same privileges as those enjoyed by the University of Montpellier. In another document, signed in Valencia on 9 May 1402, King Martí sought to promote the Estudi General of Medicine with the appointment of a number of teachers of the liberal arts, without which the study of medicine was virtually useless. From that day forth, the Estudi was known as the Estudi of Medicine and the Arts.

The prerogative granted by King Alphonse the Magnanimous in 1450, authorizing the Consell de Cent to found a university in Barcelona, was the culmination of the process initiated in 1398.

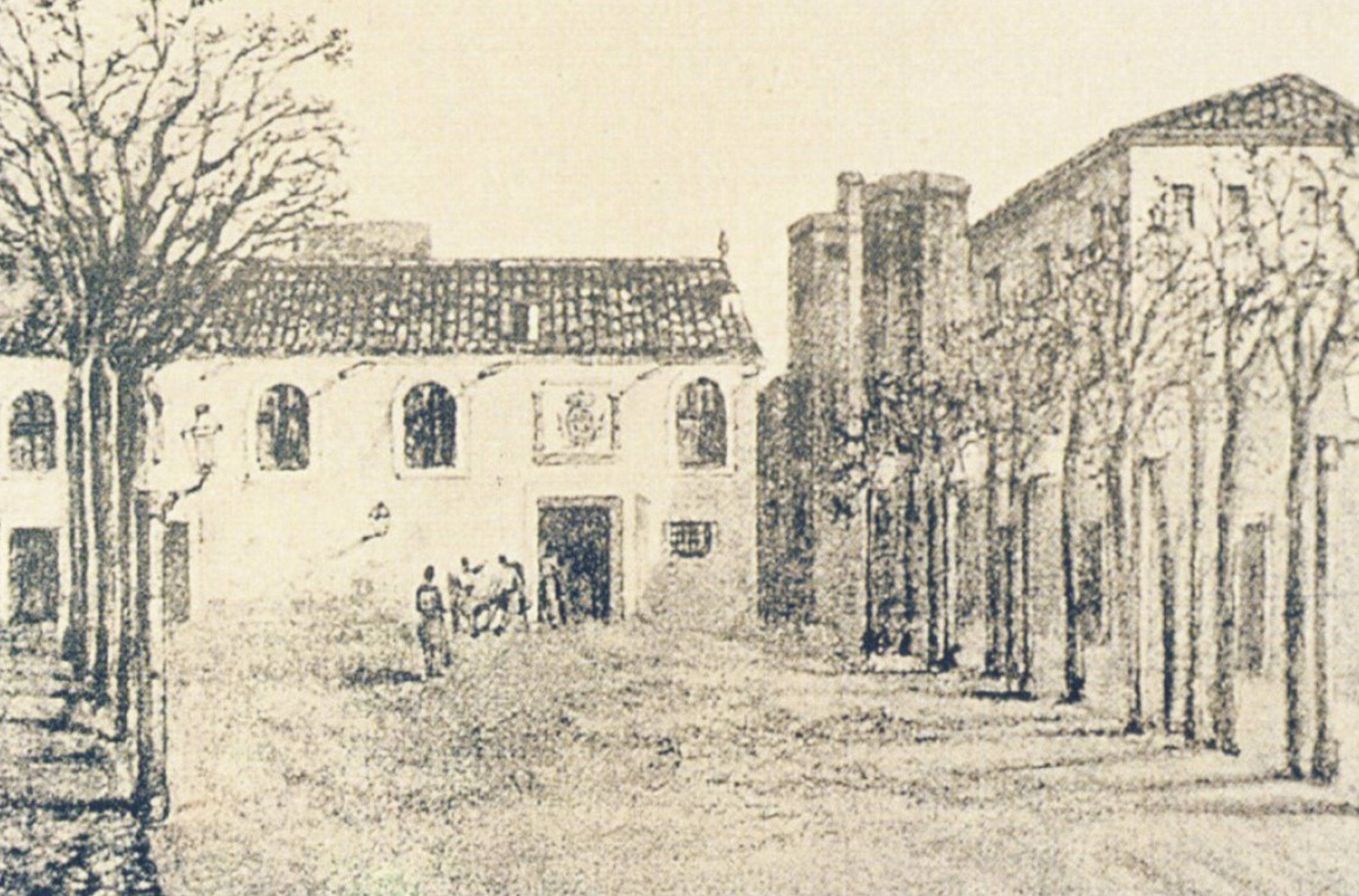
The 1536 building for the Estudi General of Barcelona at the top of La Rambla.

For a number of reasons, in particular the civil war that raged during the reign of John II and the subsequent conflicts involving the peasant farmers, the official Estudi General of Barcelona did not begin to develop until the reign of Fernando the Catholic; but it was under Charles I, in 1536, that the foundation stone was laid for the new university building at the top end of La Rambla. From that moment on the university began to carry out its work as normal despite financial difficulties and in-fighting between university teachers, though this was not to stop some illustrious professors from making their mark in their respective fields and creating their own schools of academic followers.

The 1596 Ordinances once more showed the need for reform. These followed hard on the heels of earlier Ordinances passed in 1539 and 1559, in which the competitive examination system for the appointment of professors had been introduced.

=== 1714 and the relocation to Cervera ===
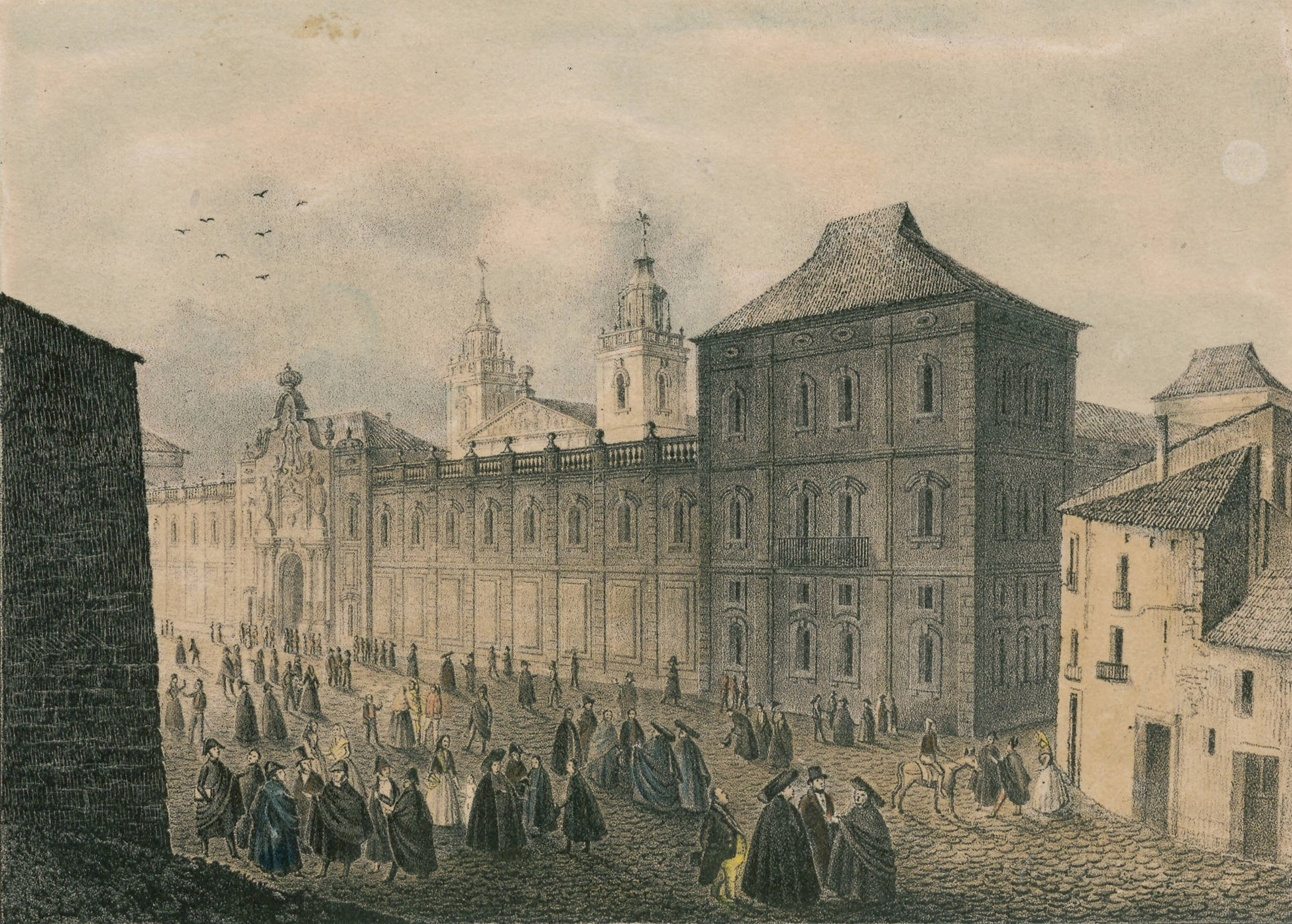
The university building in Cervera.

A new period for the institution began with the Decree issued on 23 October 1714, by the Royal High Commission for Justice and Government of Catalonia – created by the Duke of Berwick – ordering the immediate transfer of the Faculties of Philosophy, Law and Canon Law to Cervera as a punishment for the opposition to Bourbons' rule. Barcelona was to keep its Faculty of Medicine and the Cordelles School of Humanities, governed by the Jesuits. Plans to open the University of Cervera did not get underway until 1715, and it did not start its academic work until 1717, as the successor to the six Catalan universities closed down by Philip V. The first statutes of the new University of Cervera were passed in 1725. "The University of Barcelona was closed by the Bourbon dynasty after the War of the Spanish Succession from 1714 until 1837."

=== 1837 and the return to Barcelona ===
The university was restored to Barcelona during the liberal revolution during the reign of Isabella II. In 1837, the University of Cervera was transferred to Barcelona, the capital of the principality. From that moment forth it was recognized as the cultural home of the four Catalan provinces and the Balearic Islands.

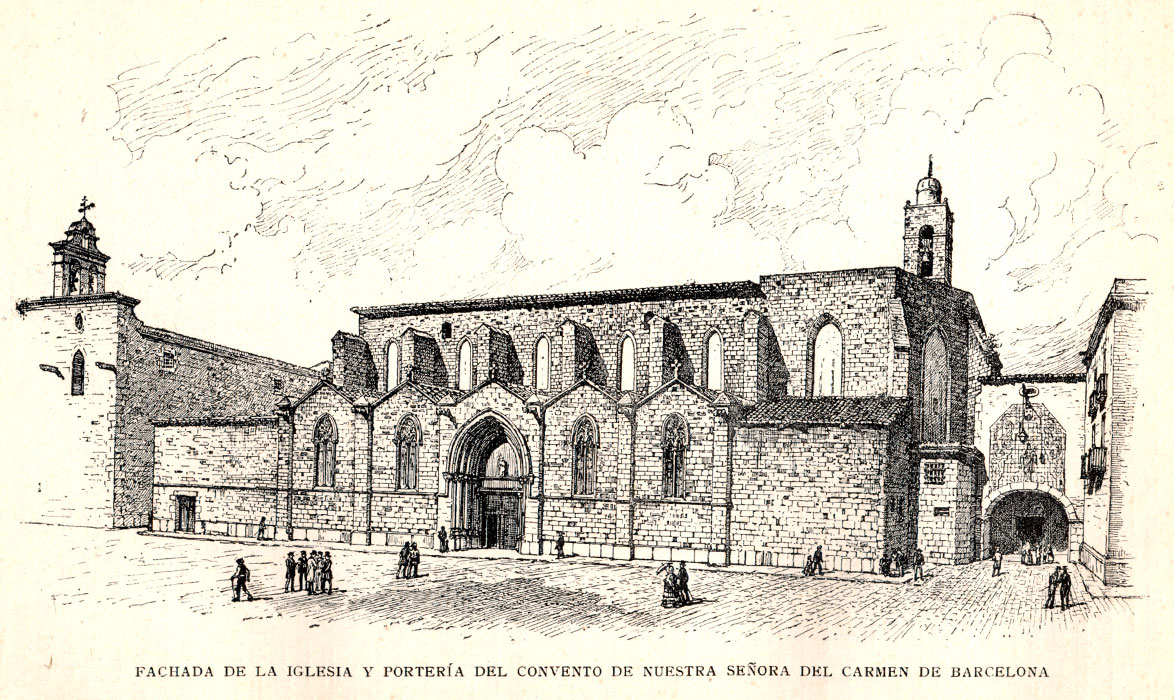
Façade of the Convent of Carme where the university was housed until the construction of Rogent's new building.

On its return the university was housed initially in the Convent of Carme, which had been disestablished a few years earlier. Here the Faculties of Canon Law, Law and Theology were provisionally installed. The Faculty of Medicine took up residence in the Royal Academy of Medicine, next door to the Hospital of Santa Creu. Thus, all the Faculties were now located in just two streets – carrer Hospital and carrer del Carme.

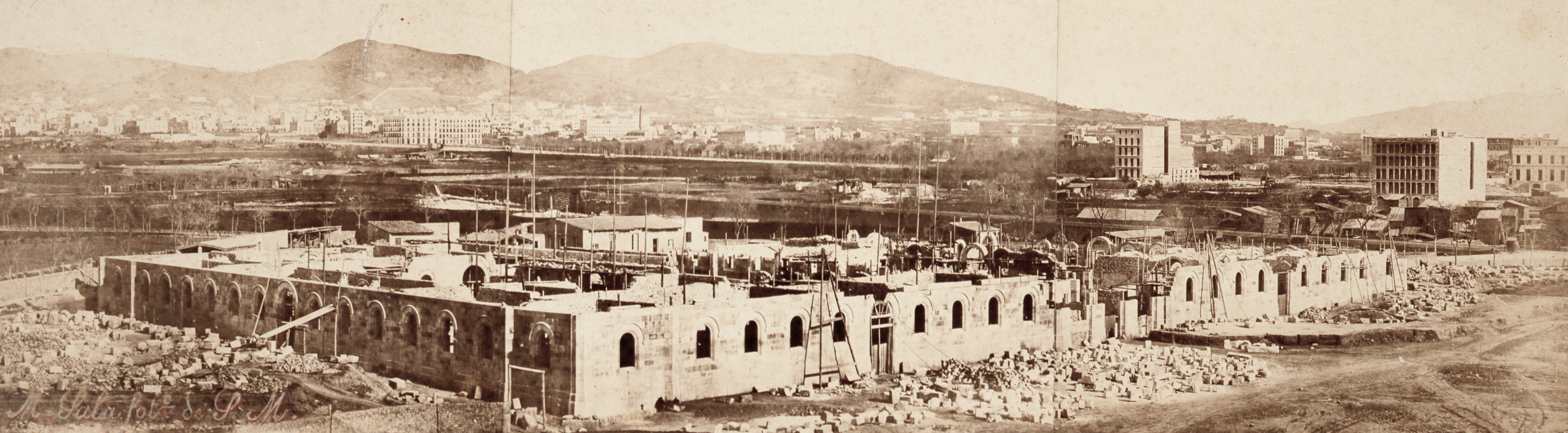

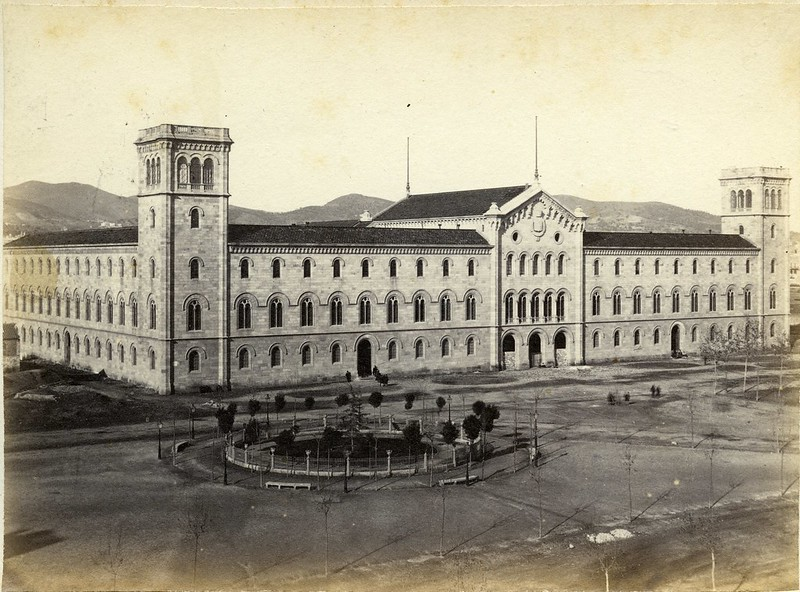
Elies Rogent's Neo-Romanesque building around 1870 right after its completion.

The inadequate nature of these premises soon gave rise to the need to construct a larger home for the university, and in 1863, work began on Elies Rogent's new building, though it would not be fully completed until 1882. Its construction was to have major repercussions for the city, since it was one of the first buildings to be raised outside the ancient city walls.

Work on the building lasted for more than twenty years, although by 1871 the first lectures were being given there. The clock and the iron bell housed in the tower in the Pati de Lletres— the "Patio of the Arts"— were installed in 1881. Complementing the building work, sculptures and paintings were commissioned either directly from artists of repute or awarded in open competition.

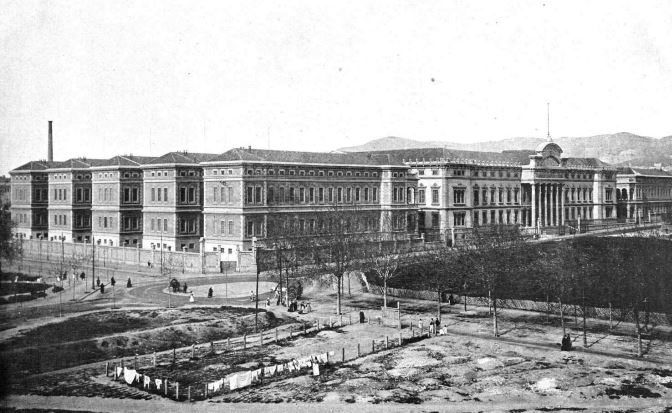
Buildings of the School of Medicine built at the turn of the 20th century.

Medical sciences continued to be taught at the former Hospital of Santa Creu i Sant Pau. In 1879, the Faculty of Medicine was presented with a project for a new hospital, and after many changes in the plans and suggested locations, it was eventually installed in the Hospital Clinic on the eastern side of the city's Eixample district in 1900. Today, Medicine is also taught on the Bellvitge Campus and at the Hospital of Sant Joan de Déu.

=== 20th century to present day ===
The natural growth of the University of Barcelona has given rise to the need to undertake large-scale building work to meet the growing demands made by student numbers that were unthinkable in the nineteenth century. In response to this growth, the university district of Pedralbes was begun in 1952. The first building to be completed on this new city campus was the Faculty of Pharmacy in 1956, alongside the Sant Raimond de Penyafort and the Verge de Montserrat Halls of Residence.

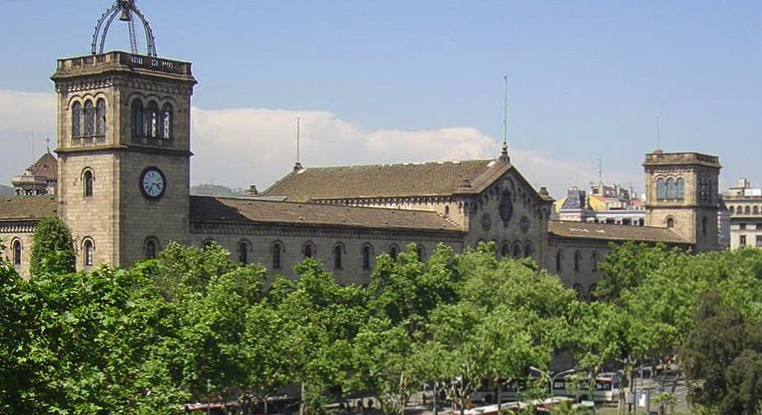
Façade of the main historic building in 2015

This was followed by the Faculty of Law in 1958, the University School of Business Studies in 1961, and the Faculty of Economics between 1957 and 1968. Today this district is known as the Pedralbes Campus, while in the nineties the university added the Campus Mundet, housed in some of the buildings of the Llars Mundet. In 2006, the Faculties of History and Geography and the Faculty of Philosophy were moved from the Pedralbes Campus to the historic centre of the city (Ciutat Vella district), in the El Raval neighborhood, and just a short walk from the Historic Building of the university.

The University of Barcelona was the only university in Catalonia until 1971, when the Universitat Politècnica de Catalunya, comprising the more technical Faculties and University Schools, became an independent entity. In 1968, the Universitat Autònoma of Barcelona became the first of several new universities to be set up in Catalonia.

== Faculties ==
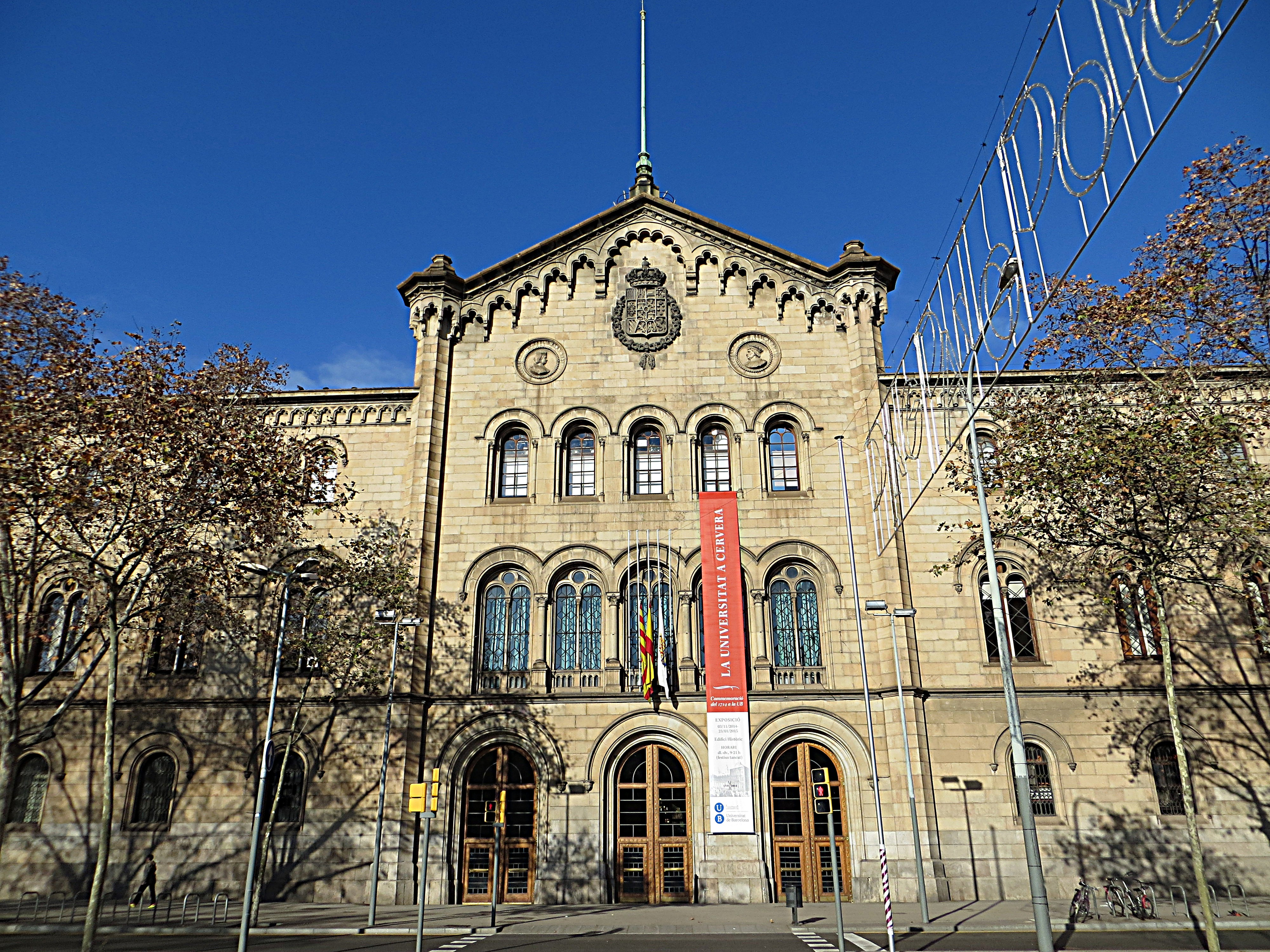
Main historic building

Building of the School of Medicine

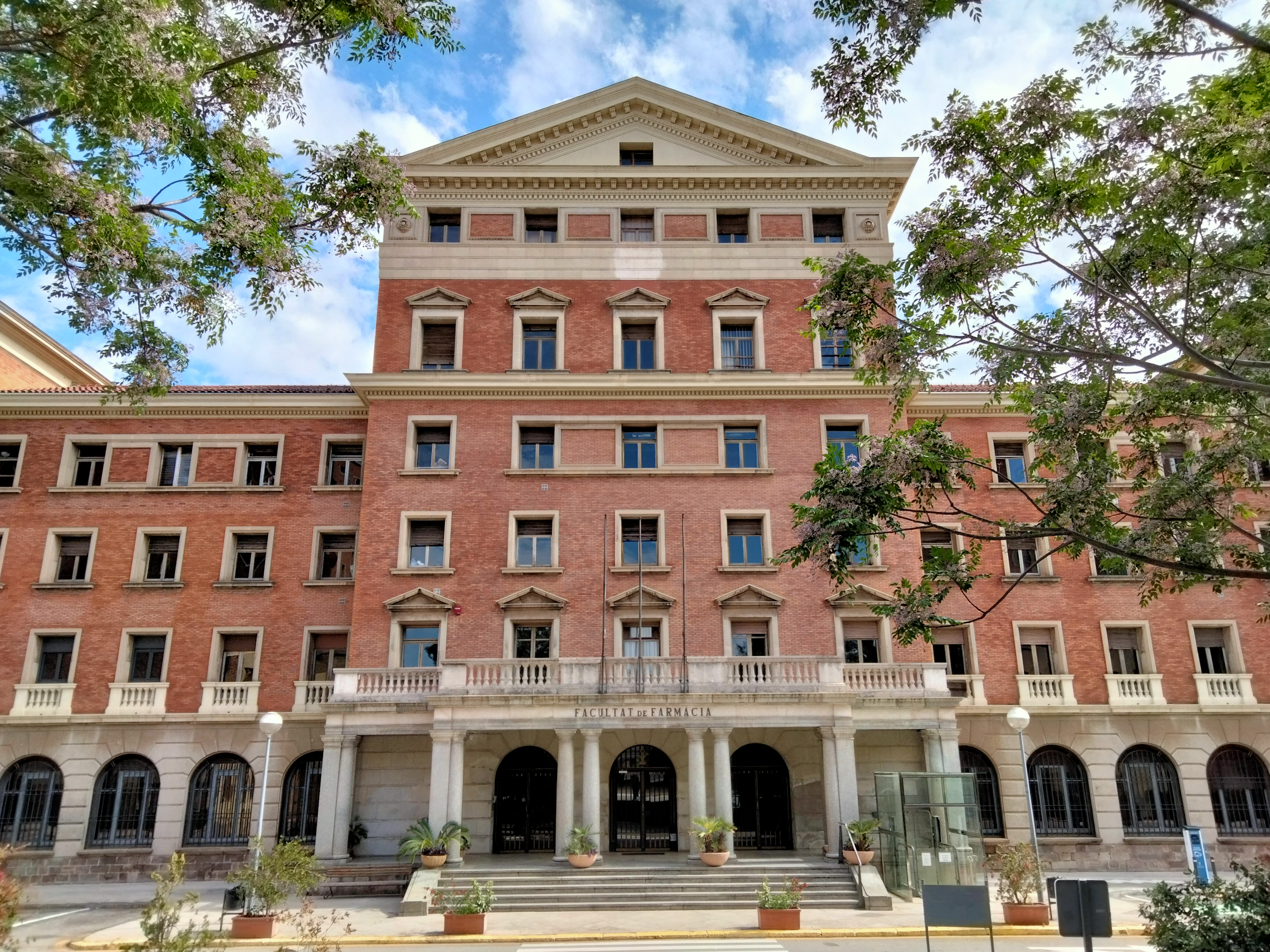
Building of the Faculty of Pharmacy

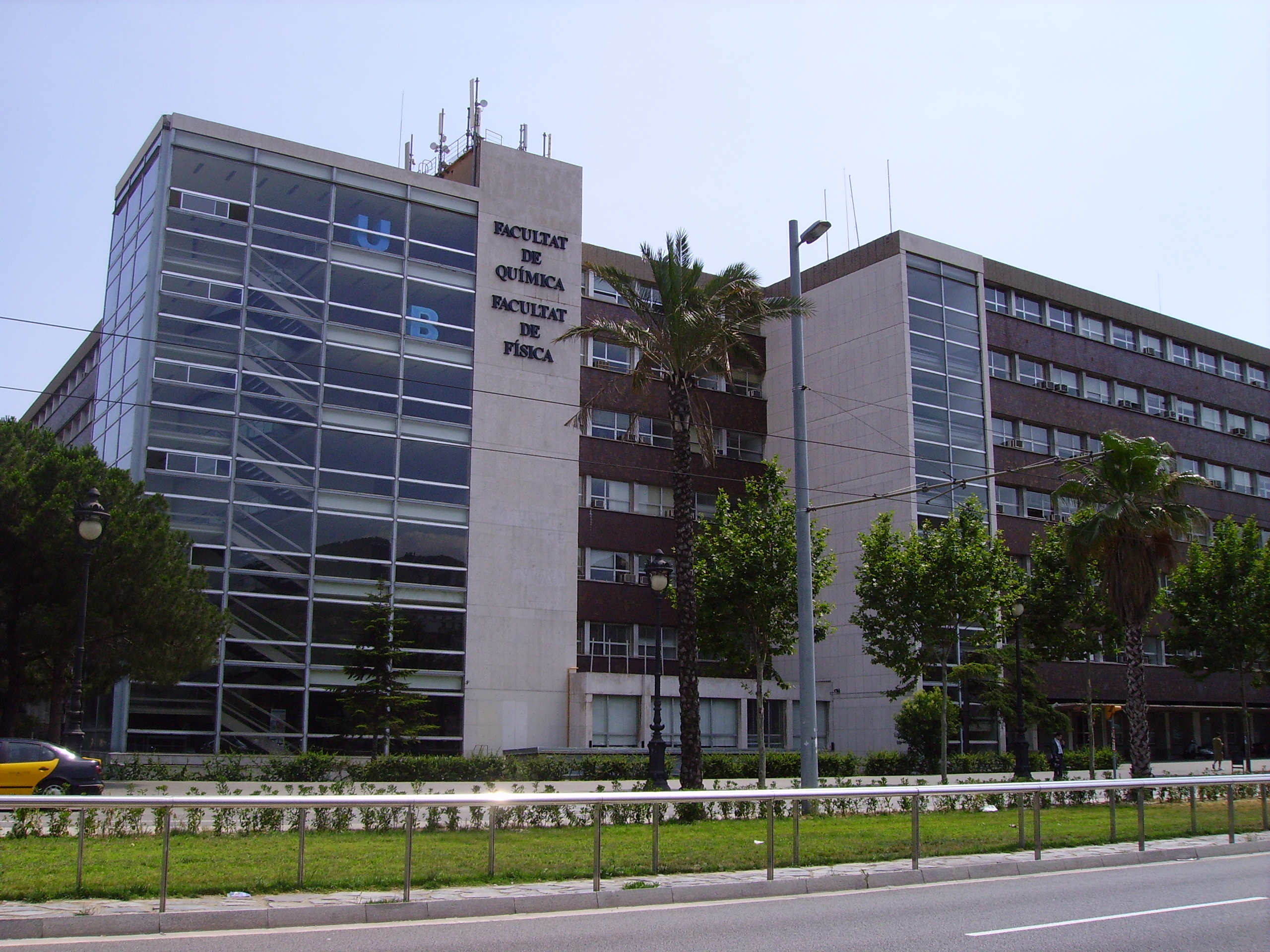
Building of the Faculty of Chemistry and Physics

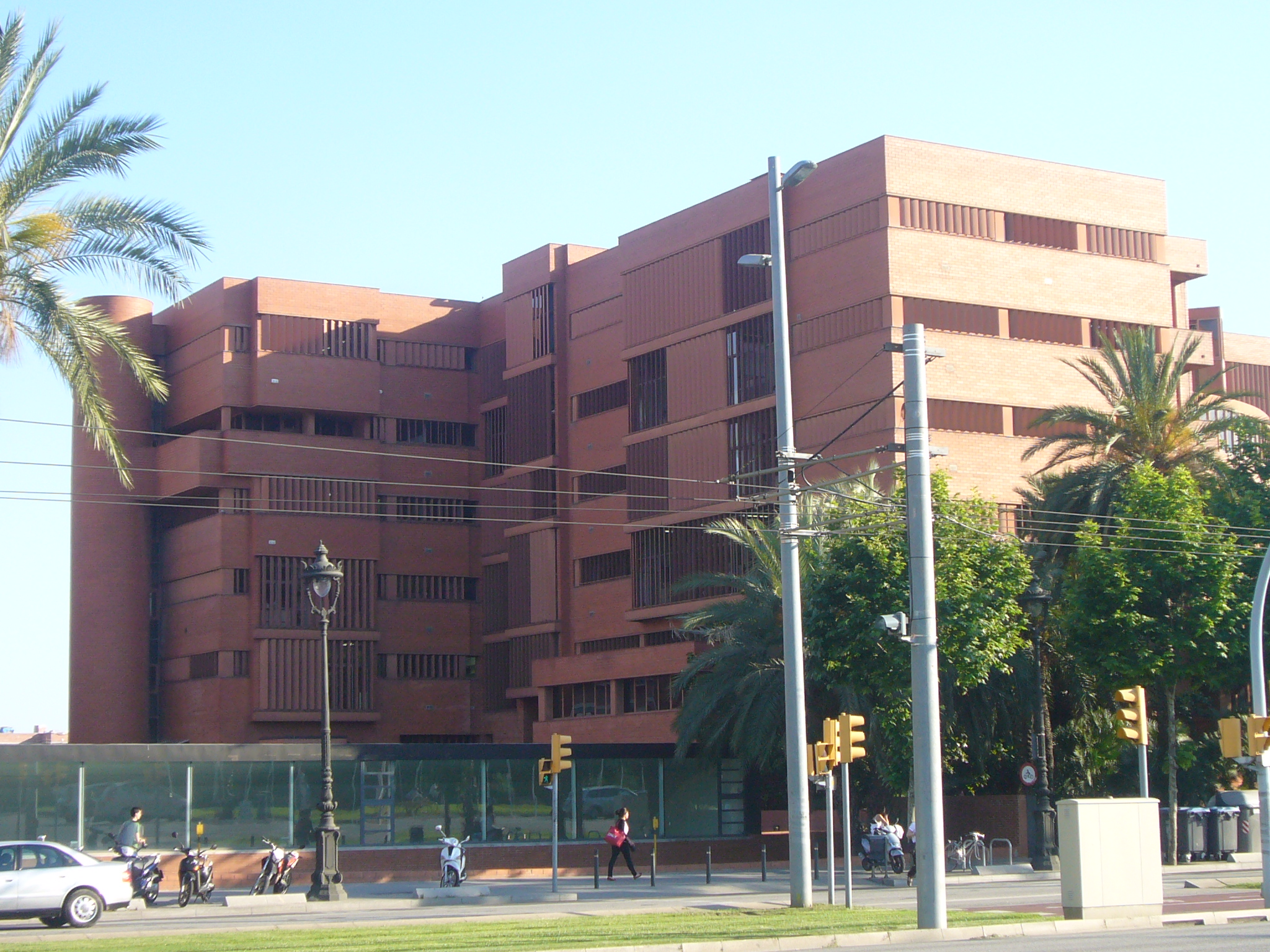
Building of the Faculty of Biology

As of 2013, the University of Barcelona comprises 100 departments grouped in 18 faculties and two university schools, one school and nine attached schools.

- Faculties
  - Faculty of Biology
  - Faculty of Chemistry
  - Faculty of Dentistry
  - Faculty of Earth Sciences
  - Faculty of Economics and Business
  - Faculty of Education
  - Faculty of Fine Arts
  - Faculty of Geography and History
  - Faculty of Law
  - Faculty of Library and Information Sciences
  - Faculty of Mathematics and Computer Sciences
  - Faculty of Medicine and Information Sciences
  - Faculty of Pharmacy and Food Sciences
  - Faculty of Philology
  - Faculty of Philosophy
  - Faculty of Physics
  - Faculty of Psychology
- University Schools
  - Barcelona Institute of International Studies (IBEI)
  - Institute of Education Sciences
  - Doctoral school
- Attached schools
  - Barcelona Technology School
  - Center for Advanced Studies in Cinema and Audiovisuals
  - Center for Advanced Studies in Public Relations
  - National Institute of Physical Education
  - Institute of Lifelong Learning (IL3-UB)
  - The New Interactive Technologies School
  - University School of Nursing
  - University School of Tourism
  - Public Safety Institute of Catalonia

The UB offers 74 undergraduate programs, 349 graduate programs and 48 doctorate programs to 63,000 students. It also has 30 research centers.

== Library ==
The library holds about 2,000,000 volumes, and is the second-biggest university library in Spain.

== International rankings ==
University rankings

Global – Overall
- ARWU World: 151-200 (2025)
- CWUR World: 136 (2025)
- CWTS World: 179 (2024)
- QS World: 160 (2026)
- THE World: 149 (2025)
- USNWR Global: 82 (2025)

National – Overall
- ARWU National: 1 (2025)
- CWTS National: 1 (2024)
- CWUR National: 1 (2025)
- QS National: 1 (2026)
- THE National: 1 (2025)
- USNWR National: 1 (2025)

In 2020, QS World University Rankings by Subject placed the UB in the top 50 for the following subjects: Anatomy and Physiology (14th), Library Science and Information Management (43rd), Philosophy (45th) and Archaeology (47th), while the ShanghaiRanking's Global Ranking of Academic Subjects (ARWU) placed it 48th for Clinical Medicine.

THE Europe Teaching Rankings 2019 ranked the UB 29th and THE 2020 Impact Rankings ranked it 91st overall, with 14th for Quality Education and 43rd for Partnerships for the Goals. The QS Graduate Employability Rankings 2020 ranked it 80th. THE2026 lists the university as 145th globally.

Overall, the University of Barcelona has been ranked 1st in Spain in most of the 2024 rankings and is located around the 50th place in Europe.

== Notable alumni ==
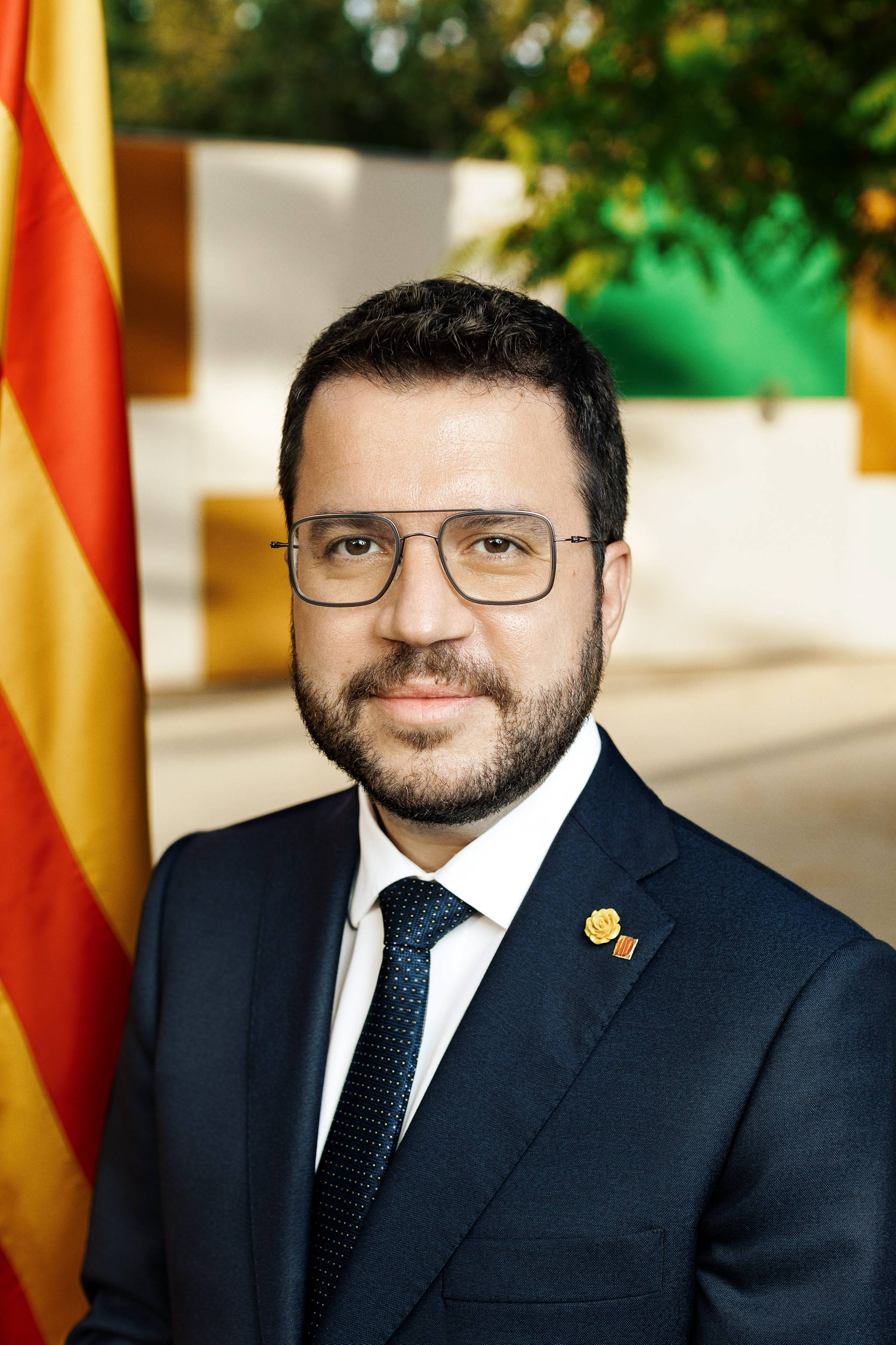
Pere Aragonès

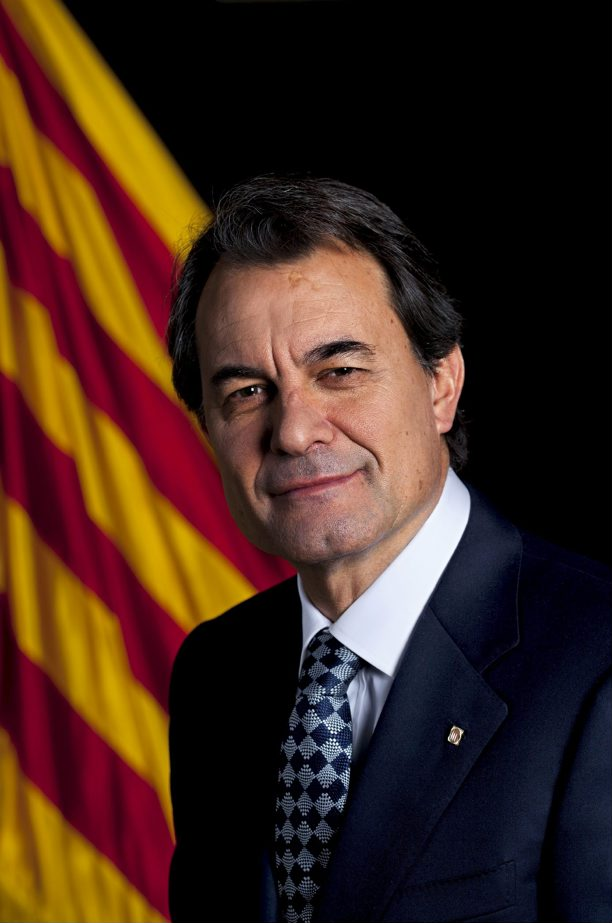
Artur Mas

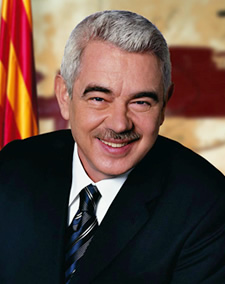
Pasqual Maragall

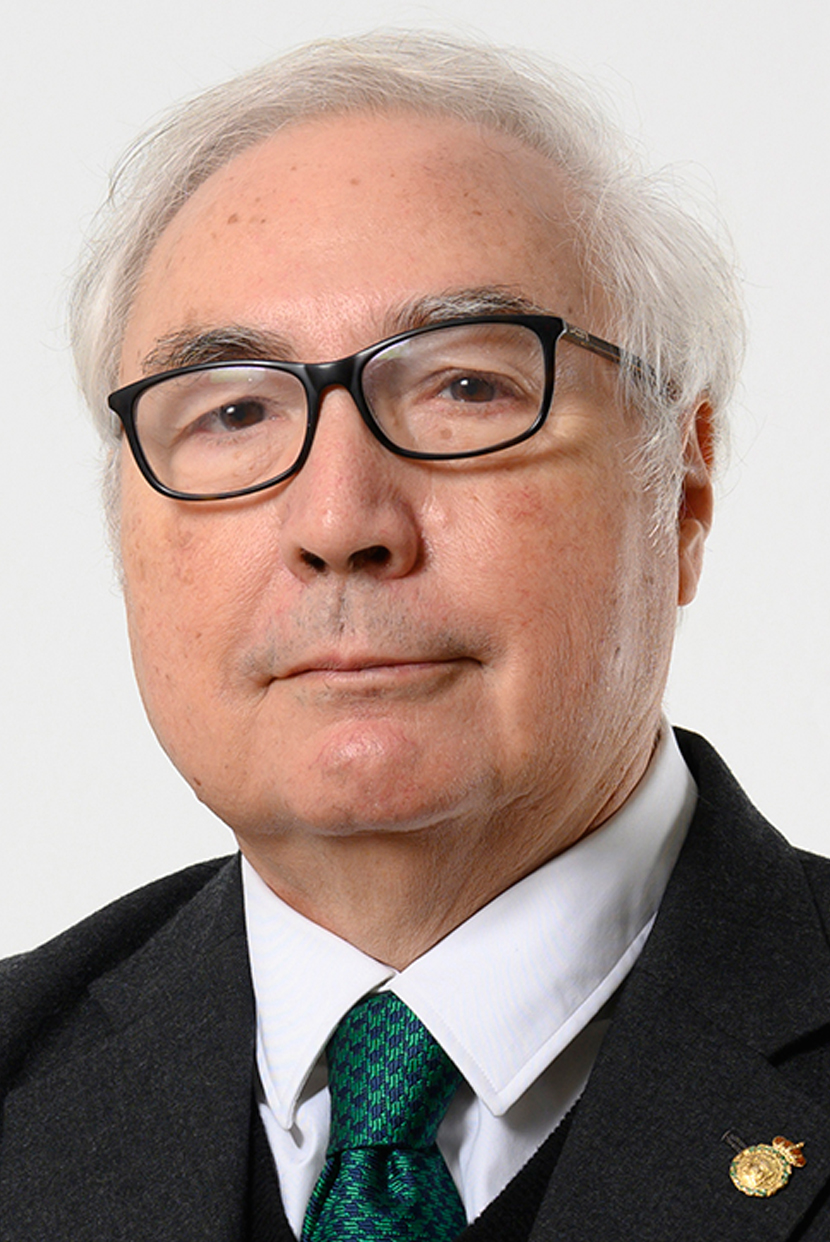
Manuel Castells

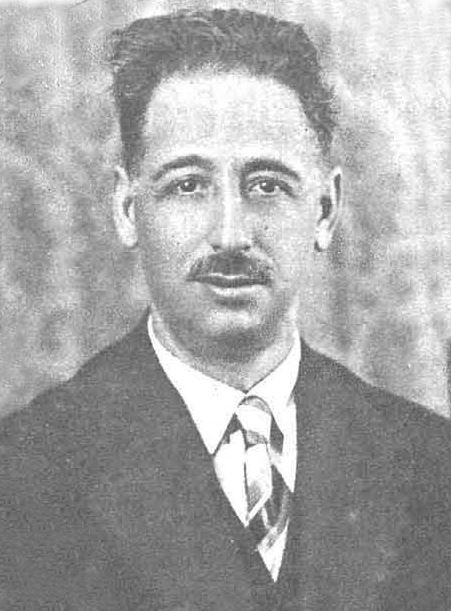
Lluís Companys

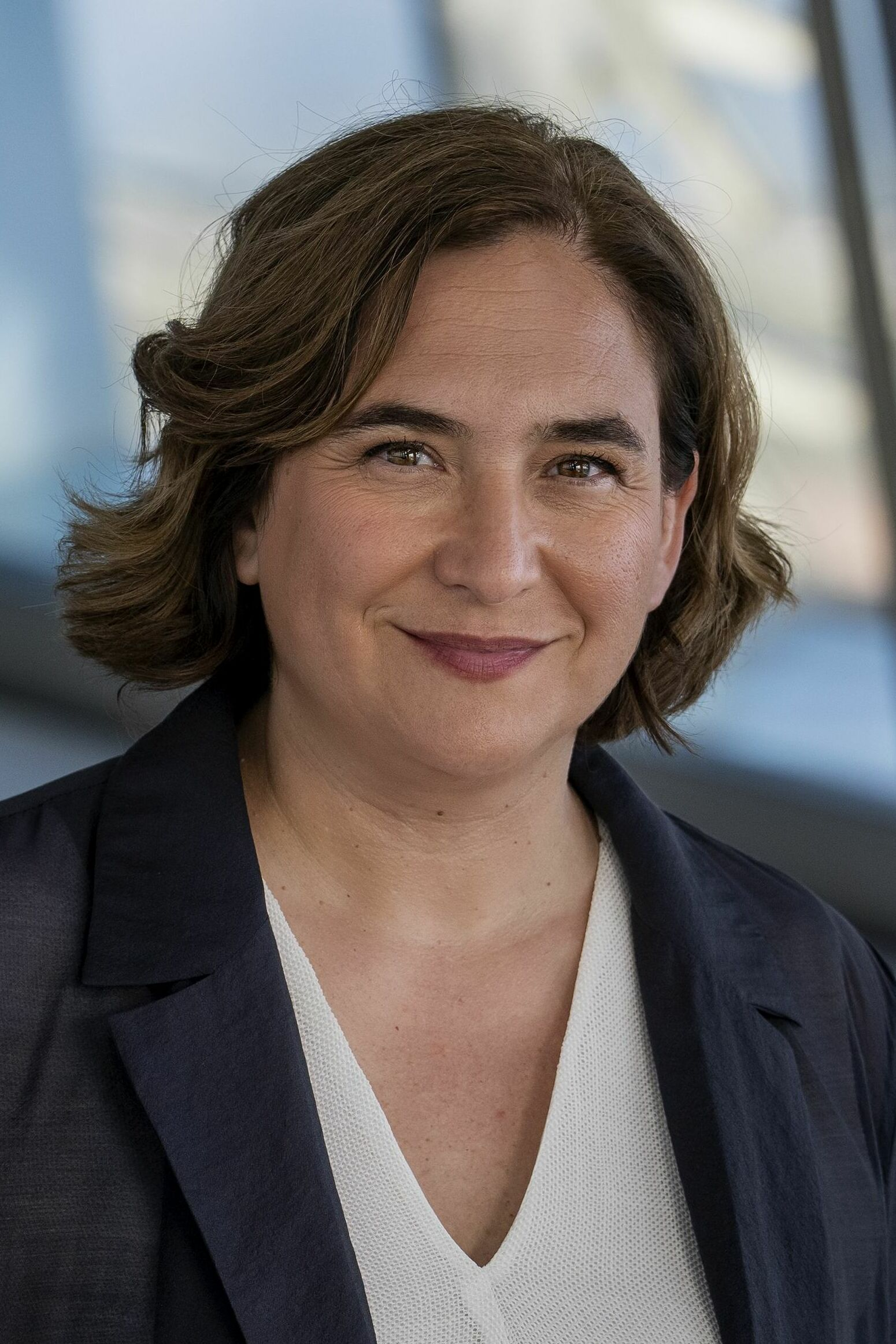
Ada Colau

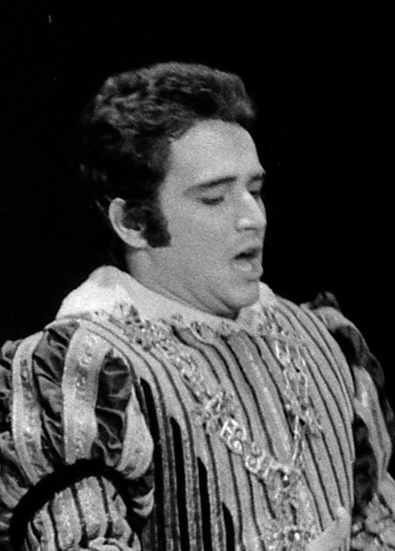
José Carreras

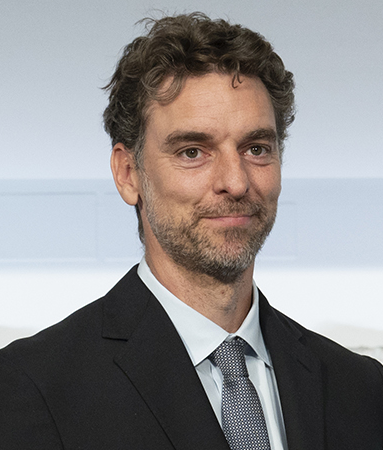
Pau Gasol

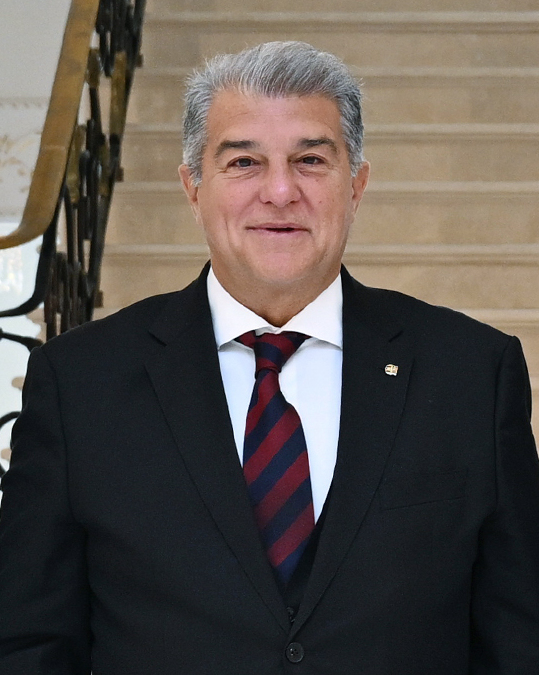
Joan Laporta

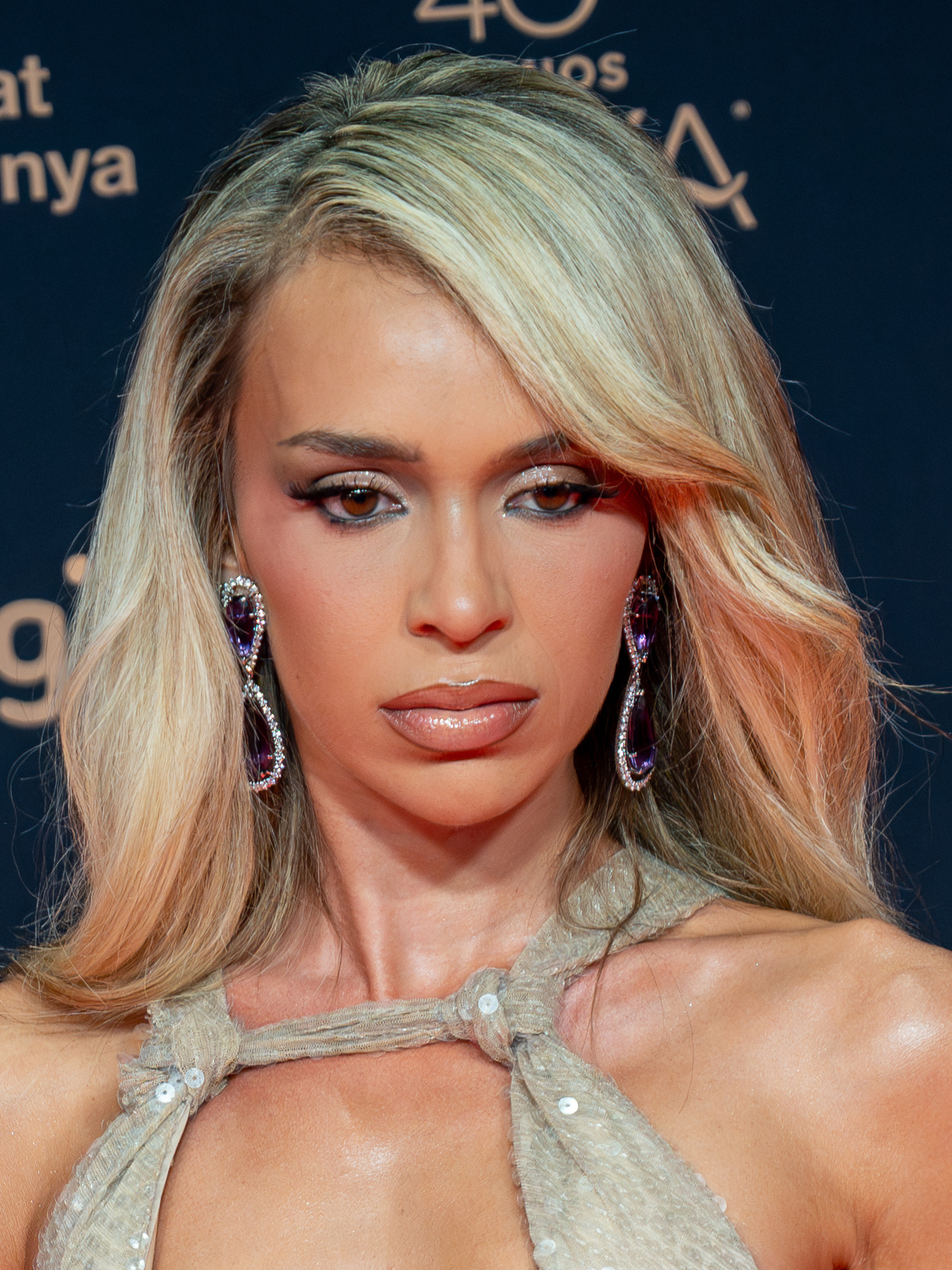
Alba Farelo i Solé

=== Academia ===
- Manuel Ballester (1919-2005) - chemist
- Lourdes Benería (born 1937) - economist
- Ramon Berguer (born 1940) - professor of cardiovascular surgery
- Manola Brunet (born 1955) - professor of climatology
- Roser Caminals-Heath - author and professor
- Eudald Carbonell (born 1953) - archaeologist, anthropologist and paleontologist
- Manuel Cardona (1934-2014) - physicist
- Francesc Xavier Hernández Cardona (born 1954) - historian
- Tomás Carreras Artau (1879-1954) - philosopher, ethnologist, politician
- Germà Colon (1928-2020) - philologist
- Joan Coromines (1905-1997) - linguist
- Sergio Erill (1938-2020) - physician; clinical pharmacologist
- Carlota Escutia Dotti (born 1959) - geologist
- Richard Arnold Epstein (1927-2016) - mathematician
- Albert Folch Folch (born 1966) - professor of bioengineering
- Xeito Fole (born 1985) - transmedia artist and researcher
- Joaquin Fuster (born 1930) - neuroscientist
- Valentín Fuster (born 1943) - cardiologist
- Juan David García Bacca (1901-1992) - philosopher
- Enrique García-Berro (1959-2017) - astrophysicist
- Thomas F. Glick (born 1939) - historian
- Pilar González i Duarte (born 1945) – chemist
- Maria Rosa Miracle Solé (1945 – 2017) – biologist
- Oriol Martorell i Codina (1927-1996) - musical director, pedagogue and professor of history
- Manuel Milà i Fontanals (1818-1884) - professor of literature
- Jaume Mora, physician
- Anthony Pagden (born 1945) - professor of political science and history
- Anna Perdrix Rosell - neuroscientist
- Jordi Folch Pi (born 1979) - biochemist
- Jordi Pujol (1911-1878) - biochemist
- Begoña Román Maestre (born 1965) – philosopher
- Aldemaro Romero Jr. (born 1951) - Venezuelan/American scientist, communicator, and public intellectual
- Antoni Rubió i Lluch (1856-1937) - historian
- Carles Feixa Pàmpols - professor of Social Anthropology
- Jordi Sabater Pi (1922-2009) - primatologist
- Marta Segarra (born 1963) - philologist
- Xavier Serra (born 1959) - musicologist
- Sunny Singh (born 1969) - writer and professor of creative writing
- Montserrat Soliva Torrentó (1943-2019) - chemist
- Juan Vernet (1923-2011) - science historian
- Muriel Villanueva i Perarnau (born 1976) – writer
- Curt Wittlin (1941-2019) - philologist
- Saturnino de la Torre (born 1941)
- Pilar Vélez Vicente (born 1957) - art historian and cultural manager
- Jesús M. Sánchez (born 1956) - jurist

=== Literature and journalism ===
- Ron Arias (born 1941) - author and journalist
- Bernardo Atxaga (born 1951) - Basque writer
- Eva Baltasar (born 1978) - poet and writer
- Guðbergur Bergsson (1932-2023) - Icelandic writer
- Salvador Brau (1842-1912) - Puerto Rican journalist, poet, dramatist, novelist, historian, and sociologist
- Annabel Cervantes (born 1969) - writer in Catalan language
- José de Diego (1866-1918) - Puerto Rican journalist, poet, politician
- Anna Dodas i Noguer (1962—1986) – poet
- Xenia Dyakonova (born 1985) – poet, translator, literary critic, and teacher of writing
- Harry Eyres - journalist, writer and poet
- Jordi Galceran (born 1964) - playwright and screen writer
- Julià Guillamon (born 1962) - writer and literary critic
- Najat El Hachmi (born 1979) - Moroccan-Spanish writer
- Albert Hauf (born 1938) - philologist, literature historian and literary critic
- Maria Mercè Marçal (1952-1998) - Catalan poet, professor, writer and translator
- Marcelino Menéndez y Pelayo (1858-1912) - historian and literary critic
- Glòria Muñoz (born 1949) - professor of painting
- Joaquín Navarro-Valls (1936-2017) - journalist, physician
- Núria Pradas (born 1954), philologist and writer of children's and youth literature
- Carles Riba (1893-1959) - poet and writer
- Màrius Torres (1910-1942) - poet
- Arantxa Urretabizkaia (born 1947) - writer, screen writer, actress
- Llorenç Vidal Vidal (born 1936) - poet, educator and pacifist

=== Performing Arts ===
- Bad Gyal (born 1997) - singer, song-writer and model
- José Carreras (born 1946) - operatic tenor
- Josep Mestres Quadreny (1929-2021) - composer
- Luisito Rey (1945-1992) - singer-songwriter
- Sylvia Steinbrecht (born 1977) - filmmaker, artistic director and production designer
- Manuel Valls (1920 – 1984) - composer, pianist, music critic, and music educator
- Pedro Alcalde (born 1959) - composer

=== Politics ===
- Valentí Almirall i Llozer (1841-1904) - politician
- Julio Anguita (1941-2020) historian and politician
- Josep Bargalló (born 1958) - teacher and politician
- Marta Cid (born 1960) - speech therapist; politician
- Lluís Companys (1882-1940) - politician
- Joan Laporta (born 1962) - lawyer and politician
- Luis Lloréns Torres (1876-1944) - Puerto Rican poet, playwright, politician
- Ernest Lluch (1937-2000) - economist, politician
- Pasqual Maragall (born 1941) - politician
- Artur Mas (born 1958) - politician
- José Montilla (born 1955) - politician
- Ricard Pérez Casado (born 1945) - politician
- Santiago Ramón y Cajal (born 1930) - politician
- Maravillas Rojo (born 1950) - politician
- Daniel Salinas (born 1962) - Uruguayan neurologist and politician
- Claudine Schneider (born 1947) - Republican U.S. representative from Rhode Island.
- Miguel Ángel Mancera (born 1966) - Mexican lawyer and politician
- Daniel Sirera (born 1967) - politician, chairman of the People's Party
- Manuela Trasobares (born 1955) - opera singer; politician
- Josep Maria Vallès (born 1949) - political scientist, politician
- Erika Torregrossa, politician, lawyer

=== Religious ===
- Maria Pilar Bruguera Sábat (1906–1994), Roman Catholic nun and physician
- Pau Claris i Casademunt (1586-1641) - lawyer and clergyman
- Peter Claver (1580-1654) - priest
- Julián Herranz Casado (born 1930) - Cardinal
- Fernando Ocariz (born 1944) - head of Opus Dei
- Joseph Oriol (1650-1702) - priest; venerated as a saint

=== Sports ===
- Pau Gasol (born 1980) - basketball player
- Josep Guardiola (born 1971) - football manager

=== Other ===
- Montserrat Cervera Rodon (born 1949) – anti-militarist, feminist, women's health activist
- Alicia Esteve Head (born 1973) - hoax survivor of World Trade Center attack
- Lola Martinez - television weather anchor

== See also ==
- List of medieval universities
