= Jesús M. Sánchez =

Spanish lawyer and jurist (born 1956)

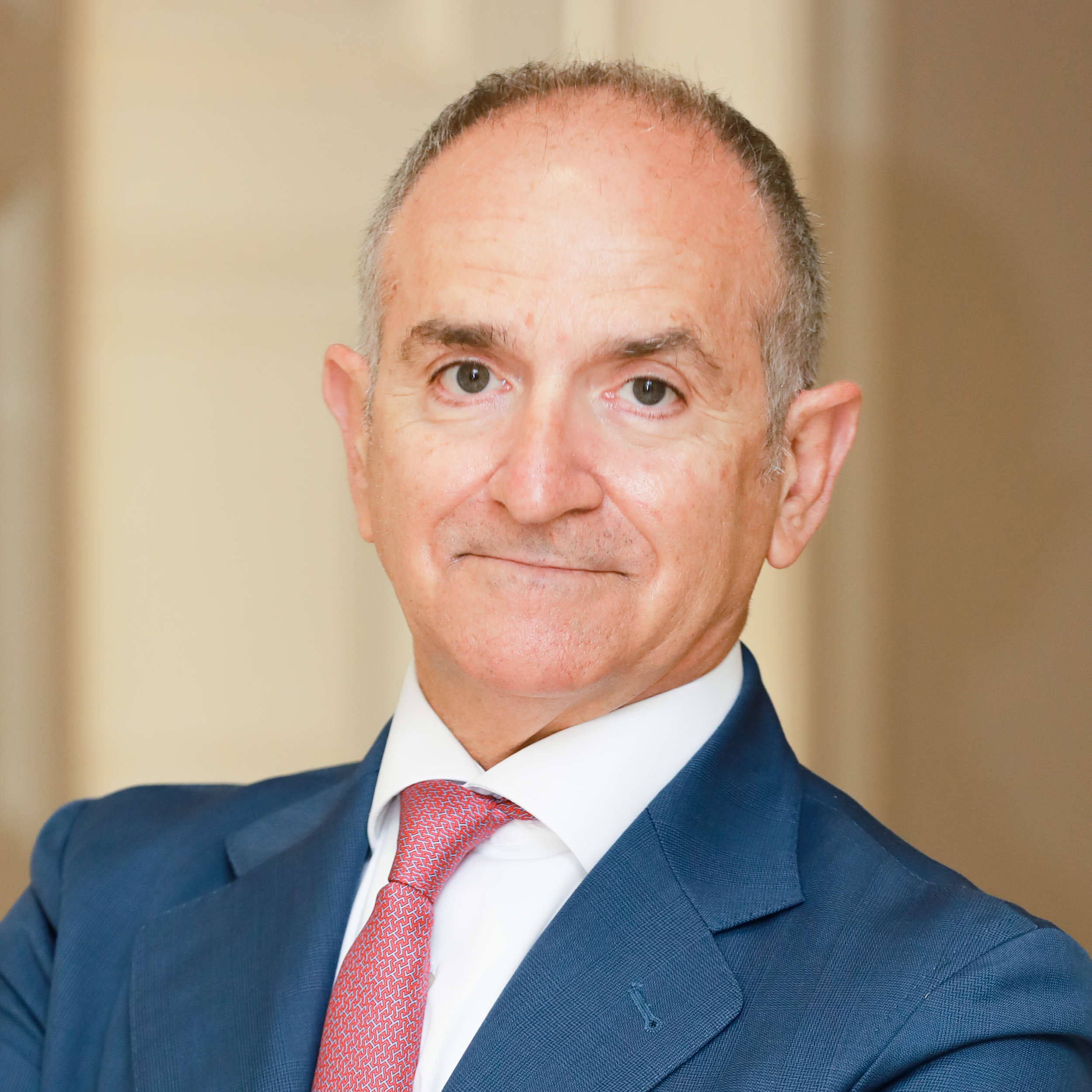
- Born: Jesús María; 1956 (age 69–70); Barcelona
- Education: Graduated in Law
- Alma mater: University of Barcelona
- Occupations: Lawyer and jurist
- Years active: 1982-
- Employer: Barcelona Bar Association (ICAB)
- Predecessor: Eugenia Gay
- Awards: Distinguished Cross of San Raimundo de Peñafort; Narcís de Sant Dioní Award; Medal of Honor for Excellence in the Service of Justice, Generalitat de Catalunya
- Website: www.icab

Jesús María Sánchez García (Barcelona, 1956) is a Spanish lawyer and jurist. He has been the Dean of the Barcelona Bar Association (ICAB) since 2022 until July 2025 and has held different positions of responsibility in Spanish bar councils and associations. He is the author of several legal works and a lecturer and professor in various academic institutions.

== Career legal ==
He graduated in Law from the University of Barcelona in 1982 and holds a Master of Research in Legal Sciences from the Abat Oliba University (2016). An expert in civil, financial and consumer law, he co-founded Zahonero & Sánchez with Javier Zahonero in 1995.

He has been Dean of the Barcelona Bar Association (ICAB) and member of the General Council of Spanish Lawyers since 2022. He is also a member of the Council of Bar Associations of Catalonia and President of the Inter-Collegiate Association of Professional Associations of Catalonia.

He became a member of the ICAB in 1983 and since then has been closely associated with the collegiate institution. He was secretary and vice-dean of the Board of Governors (2017-21), and president of the Procedural Law Section and the Rules Committee. He has also chaired the CRAJ (Commission for Relations with the Administration of Justice) of the Spanish Bar Association and the Commission for the Defence of Human Rights and International Protection-Asylum of the Catalan Bar Association.

He was elected dean in January 2022 following the appointment of his predecessor, Eugenia Gay, as government delegate in Catalonia. His work at the head of the ICAB has been aimed at promoting the training of legal professionals in digitalization, the economic improvement of the provision of legal aid, the specialization of the judicial system in children, family and capacity, and the promotion of the CRAJ. He's also responsible for the creation of the I+DRET and the three Observatories in the ICAB - Human Rights, Personal Insolvency and Full Equality.He has participated in various legislative processes in Catalonia and Spain, such as the Catalan Law 4/2016 on the protection of the right to housing for people at risk of housing exclusion; and the Spanish Law 5/2018 amending the Civil Procedure Law on the illegal occupation of dwellings. He is also a strong advocate of state court fees being directly reinvested in the justice system of each autonomous region.

He has received several awards and recognitions: the Medal of Honor for Excellence in the Service of Justice, awarded by the Generalitat de Catalunya; the Distinguished Cross of San Raimundo de Peñafort; the Narcís de Sant Dioní Award, awarded by the Girona Bar Association; the Creu de l'Advocacia Catalana, awarded by the Consell de l'Advocacia Catalana (CICAC); and the Confilegal Commitment Award (2024).

== Training and Outreach ==
He has been a lecturer at the School of Legal Practice and on several master's degrees in Procedural Law at the ICAB, as well as a lecturer. He has also taught on litigation courses and on the Master's Degree in Access to the Legal Profession at the Universitat Abat Oliba and at the Universitat Oberta de Catalunya.

He is the author of the monographs "La cosa juzgada en el ámbito de los consumidores y los efectos retroactivos de la cláusula suelo declarada abusiva" (Res judicata in consumer law and the retroactive effects of floor clauses declared unfair) published by VLex in 2017; "Aspectos prácticos del Crédito Revolving" (Practical aspects of revolving credit) by Tirant Lo Blanch (2022) and "Ley de usura y control de transparència en el crédito revolving" (Law on usury and transparency control in revolving credit), VLex (2025). He is co-director of the collective work "Clàusula rebus sic stantibus", 2021, and contributor to specialised legal journals and newspapers, mainly on procedural law and consumer law.
