= Enrique García-Berro =

Catalonian–Spanish astrophysicist (1959 - 2017)

Enrique García-Berro Montilla
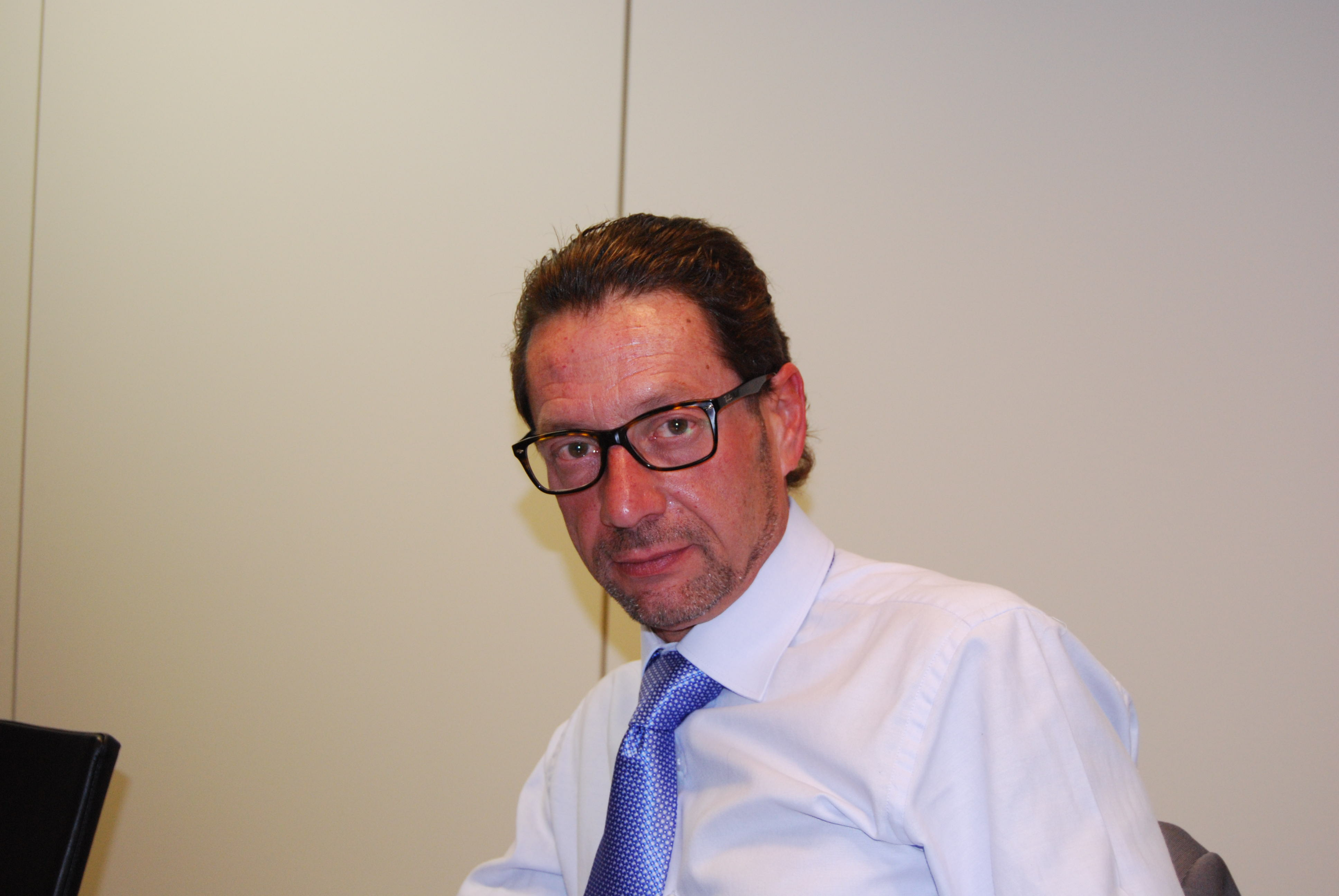
- García-Berro in 2013
- Born: March 3, 1959; Jaen, Spain
- Died: September 23, 2017 (aged 58); Sallent de Gállego, Spain

Enrique García-Berro Montilla (1959 - 2017) was a Spanish and Catalan astrophysicist. He was a world-recognized expert in stellar astrophysics, in particular in the theory of white dwarf stars and type Ia supernovae.

== Life and career ==
García-Berro earned his master's degree in physics from the University of Barcelona in 1982 with highest honors. He went on at Barcelona to pursue his Ph.D. with Jordi Isern. He earned his Ph.D. in theoretical astrophysics in 1987 cum laude.

In 1987, García-Berro was appointed associate professor in Applied Physics at the Polytechnic University of Catalonia (UPC). In 2003, he was promoted to full Professor. From 2006 to 2013, he was the Vice-Rector at the UPC. García-Berro proved to be a capable administrator, and was appointed to be the director of the Serra Húnter program, designed to attract world-class faculty to Catalonian universities. García-Berro also served as the assistant director of the Institut d'Estudis Espacials de Catalunya (IEEC) from 2002 to 2005.

García-Berro was married to Isabel, a biologist at the University of Barcelona, and the couple had three children: Aurora, Inés and Ignacio. García-Berro was an avid athlete and fan of outdoors sports, and was a keen mountain hiker and cyclist.

== Research ==
García-Berro was a highly-productive scientific researcher and made a number of important contributions to the knowledge of stellar evolution, with a particular emphasis on white dwarfs. During a stay at the University of Illinois at Urbana–Champaign, he collaborated with the renowned astrophysicist Icko Iben on the theory of stars whose initial masses are between 9 and 11 times the mass of the sun, right at the cusp between stars which ultimately form white dwarfs, and those which undergo gravitational collapse. Together, they published a series of papers which remain standards in the field.

Towards the end of his life, García-Berro carried out pioneering three-dimensional simulations of merging white dwarfs with his students and collaborators. These merging white dwarf systems are believed to give rise to a range of interesting stellar systems, from strongly-magnetized white dwarfs, to Type Ia supernovae and R Coronae Borealis variable stars, to gravitational wave sources.

He advised 14 PhD Theses and at least 12 degree or master theses most of them at the UPC. Several of these were related to the Gaia space astrometry mission of ESA, including works on payload data handling and compression. Some led to publications on this more technological field, with the last one being published shortly after his death. These works triggered his participation as co-founder and associate of a spin-off company of the UPC and also of the UB, aiming at commercial applications of a patented data compression technology that he co-invented.

== Death ==
García-Berro was killed in a climbing accident on September 23, 2017, on the Picos del Infierno in the Pyrenees, near Sallent de Gállego, Spain.
