= César Andrade =

Brazilian professional vert skater

Cesar Andrade
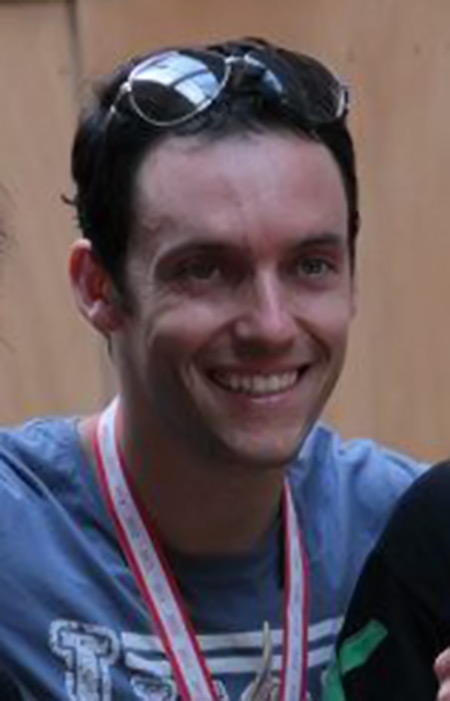

Personal information
- Born: April 25, 1979 (age 47) São Paulo, Brazil
Medal record
Competitions
Representing Brazil
Bronze medal – third place	2002 Latin American X Games	Vert

Cesar Andrade is a Brazilian professional vert skater. Andrade started skating when he was 15 in 1994 and turned professional in 2002. Andrade has attended many competitions in his vert skating career.

Best Tricks Double Backflip 180

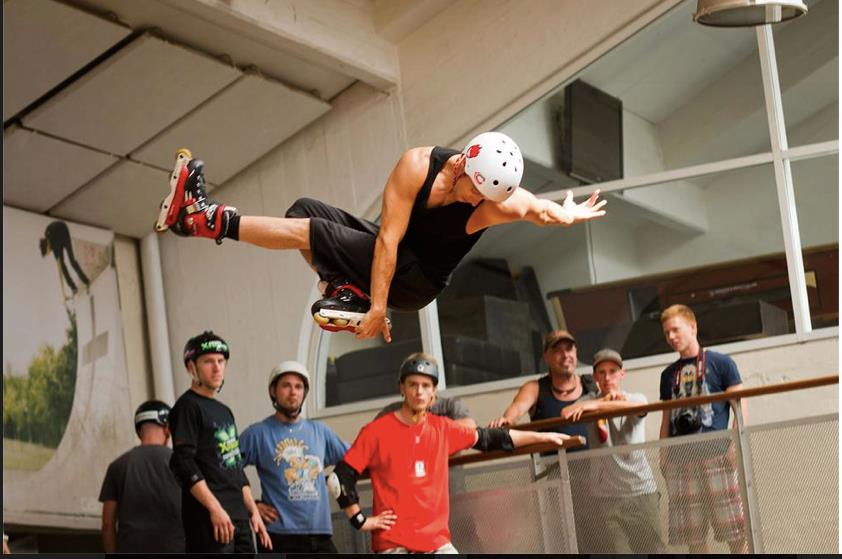
Cesar vert skating

== Vert competitions ==
- 2002 Latin American X Games Medalists
