= Enrique García-Máiquez =

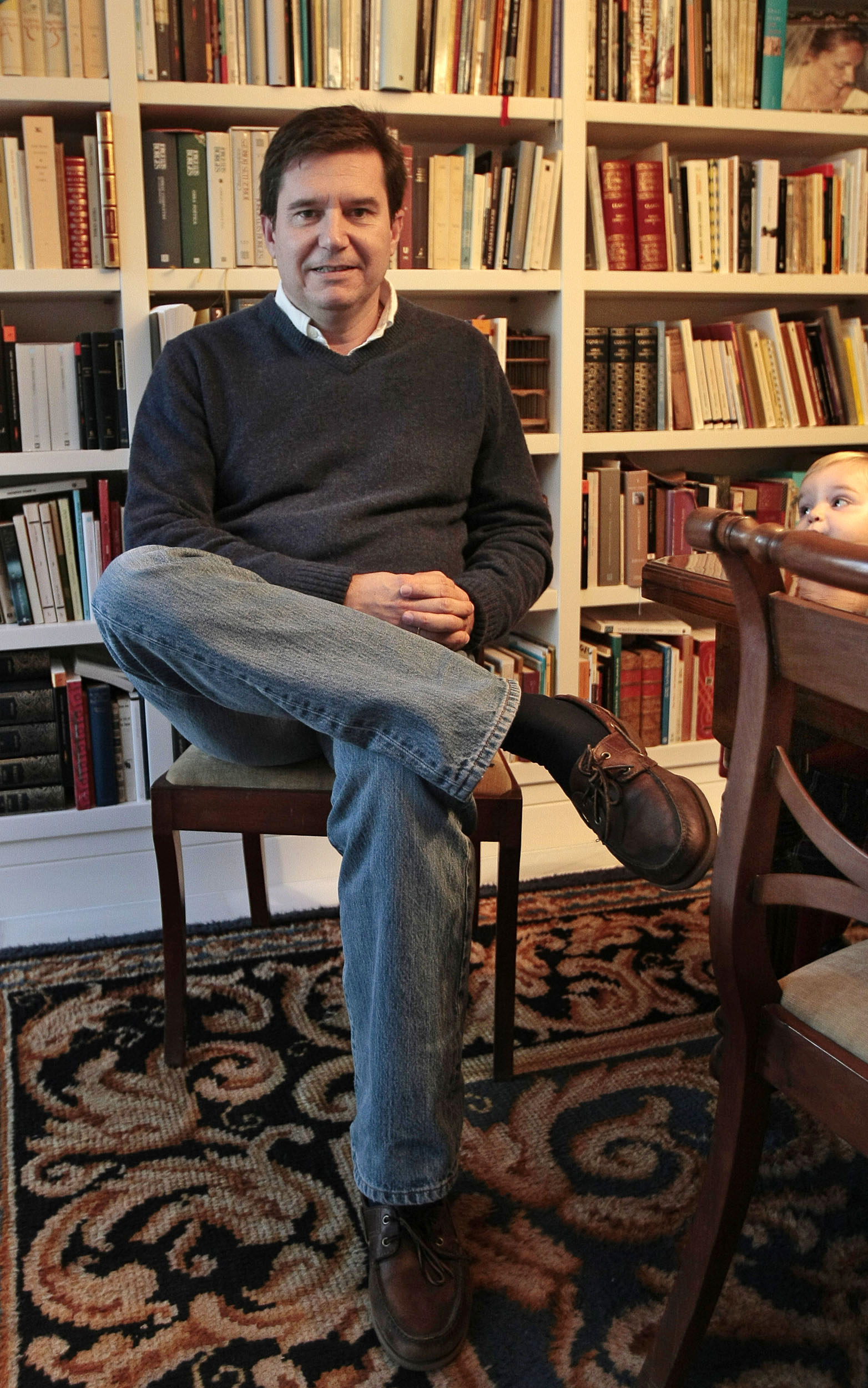
- Enrique García-Máiquez
- Born: 1969 (age 56–57); Murcia (Spain)
- Occupations: Poet and Writer
- Writing career
- Genres: poetry, essay, journalism
- Website: www.egmaiquez.blogspot.com

Enrique García-Máiquez (born Murcia, 1969) and always living in El Puerto de Santa María), is a Spanish poet. He also writes essays, articles on literary criticism and newspaper columns. He is married, has one daughter and a son.

In the context of contemporary Spanish poetry, Angel Luis Prieto de Paula depicts him as someone who has gotten to take it to a path of rehumanisation, in his search for an art with totalising purpose. For Abel Feu his poetry is astounding for his wit, puns and idiomatic distortions, mastery of prosody, strophic versatility, nearness and its focus on everyday life (...), all sustained in a thorough lyrical impulse and a transcendent vision. He has been anthologised several times, in the books by Magalhães, Baltanás and Feu.

In prose he has published Lo que ha llovido, an anthology of texts from his blog. He has an opinion syndicated column in the newspapers of Joly Group. He also writes poetry criticism in newspaper and specialized reviews (Clarín, Númenor, Poesía digital). He edited the literary review Nadie parecía for Renacimiento (National Prize to Edition in 2003).

== Poetry ==
- Haz de luz (Pre-Textos, Valencia, 1996). Villa de Cox Prize.
- Ardua mediocritas (Ánfora Nova, Rute, 1997). National Prize for Poetry "Mariano Roldán", 1996.
- Casa propia (Renacimiento, Sevilla, 2004).
- Alguien distinto (Colección Haiku. Los papeles del sitio, Valencina, 2005).
- Con el tiempo (Renacimiento, Sevilla, 2010).
- Mal que bien (Colección Adonáis, Rialp, Madrid, 2019).
- Inclinación de mi estrella (Los Papeles del sitio, Valencina, 2022).
- Verbigracia [Poesía completa] (La Veleta, Granada, 2022).
- Calla, calla, que te entiendo. Númenor, Cuadernos de Poesía 48 (Fundación Altair, Sevilla, 2026).

== Journals ==
- Lo que ha llovido (Númenor, 2009).
- El pábilo vacilante (Renacimiento, Sevilla, 2012).
- Un largo etcétera (Númenor, Sevilla, 2016).
- Contentamiento de haber nacido (Madrid, Homo Legens, Colección Ibarra Real, 2025).

== Essays ==
- Gracia de Cristo (Monóculo, Madrid, 2023).
- Ejecutoria. Una hidalguía del espíritu (CEU Ediciones, Madrid, 2024).

== Aphorisms ==
- Palomas y serpientes (La Veleta, Comares, Granada, 2015).
- El vaso medio lleno (More Ediciones, Madrid, 2020).

== Collected Articles ==
- De ida y vuelta (La Isla de Siltolá, Sevilla, 2011).
- Un paso atrás (Rialp, Madrid, 2012).
- El burro flautista (Comares, Granada, 2021).

== Editor of other authors ==
- Miguel d'Ors: 2001. Poesías escogidas (Númenor, Sevilla, 2001).
- Luis Rosales: Antología poética (Rialp, Madrid, 2005).
- José Miguel Ibáñez Langlois: Oficio (Antología poética) (Númenor, Sevilla, 2006).
- Pedro Sevilla: Todo es para siempre. Antología poética (Renacimiento, Sevilla 2009).
- José Jiménez Lozano: El precio. Antología poética (Renacimiento, Sevilla 2013).
- Tu sangre en mis venas. Poemas al padre (Renacimiento, Sevilla, 2017).
- Luis Rosales: Aforismos extraídos (Siltolá, Sevilla, 2018).
- G. K. Chesterton: Un buen puñado de ideas. Aforismos sobrevenidos, with Luis Daniel González (Renacimiento, Sevilla, 2018).

== Poetry translations ==
- G. K. Chesterton Lepanto y otros poemas. Poemas escogidos (Renacimiento, Sevilla, 2003).
- Mario Quintana Puntos suspensivos (antología) (Los papeles del sitio, Valencina, 2007).
- William Shakespeare: Tomás Moro (Rialp Ediciones, Madrid, 2012), with Aurora Rice.
- Mario Quintana: Intenta olvidarme (antología) (Rialp Ediciones, Colección Adonáis, 2018).

== Forewords ==
- Pablo Moreno Prieto, De alguna manera (Altair, Sevilla, 1999).
- G. K. Chesterton, La superstición del divorcio (traducción de Aurora Rice) (Los papeles del sitio, Valencina 2007).
- Miguel d'Ors, Virutas de taller (Los papeles del sitio, Valencina 2007).
- Aquilino Duque, Los agujeros negros (Paréntesis, Sevilla, 2009).
- G. K. Chesterton, La cosa y otros artículos de fe (coedited with Aurora Rice) (Renacimiento, Sevilla 2010).
- W. R. Titterton, G. K. Chesterton, mi amigo (edtion and translation with Aurora Rice) (Rialp, Madrid 2011).
- José Manuel Mora Fandos, Tan bella, tan cerca (Escritos sobre estética y vida cotidiana) (La Isla de Siltolá, Sevilla 2011).
- José Cereijo, Antología personal (Polibea, Madrid, 2011).
- José Jiménez Lozano, El precio (Renacimiento, Sevilla, 2013).
- Karmelo C. Iribarren, Diario de K. (Renacimiento, Sevilla, 2014).
- Fabriçe Hadjadj, Últimas noticias del hombre (y de la mujer) (Homo Legens, Madrid, 2018).
- Roger Scruton, Cómo ser conservador (Homo Legens, Madrid, 2018).
