= Enrique García Hernán =

Spanish historian

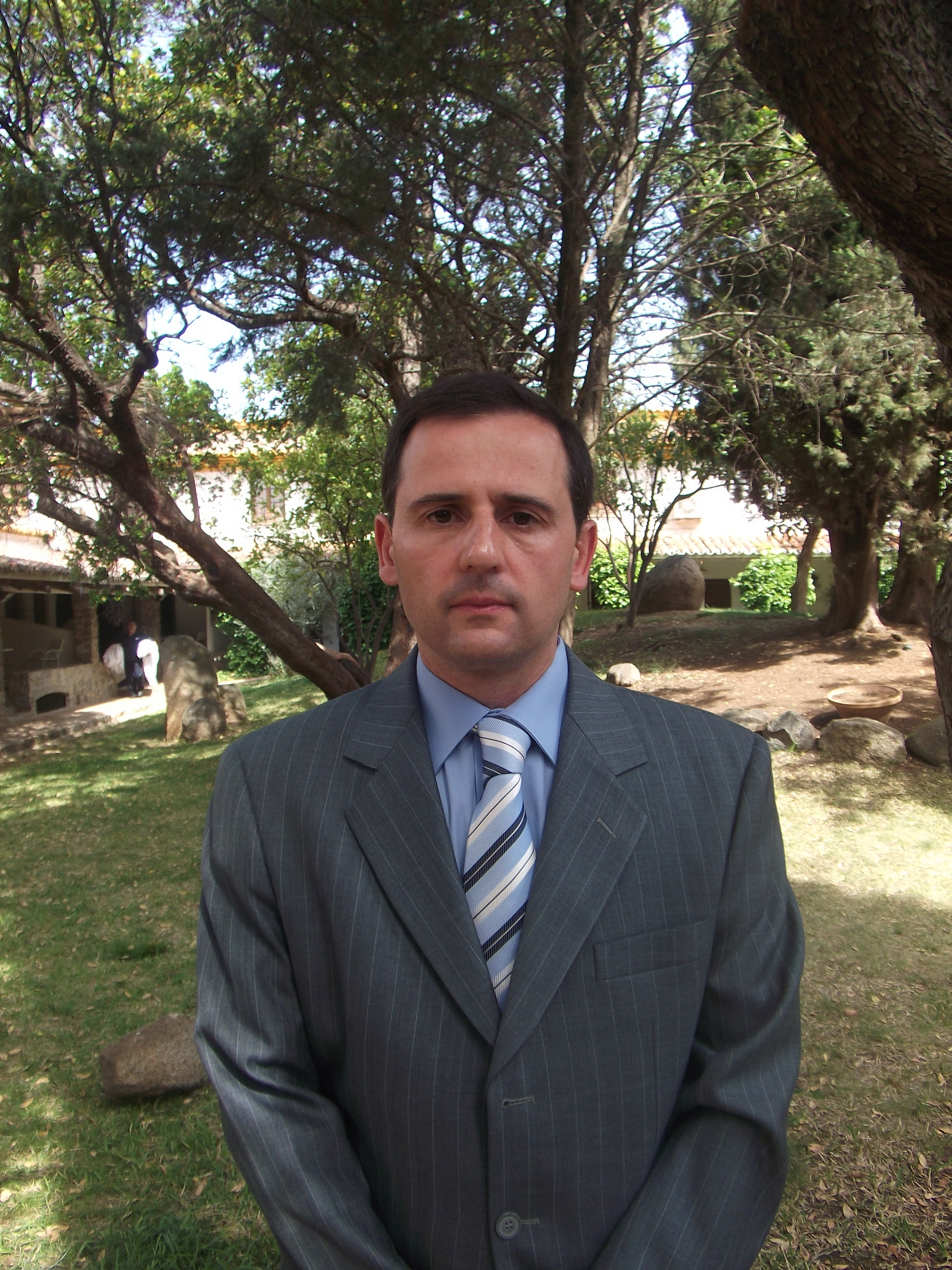
García Hernán in June 2012.

Enrique García Hernán (Madrid 1964) is a Spanish historian of the culture of early modern Europe. His research examines the interaction of religious sentiment, political thought and international relations in the sixteenth, seventeenth and eighteenth centuries. It attempts to bridge the gap between the study of forms of cultural and intellectual expression and the realities of political, diplomatic and military organization. He is a Corresponding Fellow (Académico correspondiente) of the Royal Academy of History (Real Academia de la Historia), member of the Board of Directors (Vocal) of the Spanish Commission for Military History (la Comisión Española de Historia Militar), and Fellow (Académico) of the Ambrosiana Academy of Milan (la Academia Ambrosiana de Milán). His current academic affiliation is as a research professor (Profesor de Investigación) in the Institute of History, within the Center for Humanities and Social Sciences (Centro de Ciencias Sociales y Humanas) at the Spanish National Research Council (Consejo Superior de Investigaciones Científicas or ‘CSIC’). The Spanish National Research Council is the largest public institution dedicated to research in Spain and the third largest in Europe.

== Career trajectory ==
García Hernán has two doctorates, one in ecclesiastical history from the Gregorian University of Rome, and one within the discipline of early modern history from the University Complutense of Madrid. He has published more than ten monograph studies (single-authored) and one joint-study with his brother, David García Hernán. In addition he has edited or co-edited nine books, and authored more than seventy articles in Spanish, English and Italian. He is one of the editors of a new series of monograph studies dedicated to the international impact of Spain, entitled the Historia de España y su proyección internacional, which is published by Albatros Ediciones in Madrid.

His first research focused on Saint Francis Borgia and this project led to the publication of a major monograph on Borgia’s diplomatic efforts on behalf of the Papacy in 1571 and 1572.

García Hernán's other principal area of interest lies in the relationship between Ireland, the Spanish Monarchy and the Papacy in the sixteenth-, seventeenth- and eighteenth-centuries.

García Hernán is an academic adviser to the editors of the new military history of Spain, Historia Militar de España, whose overall director is Hugo O´Donnell. At present five volumes have been published by Laberinto.

A number of other projects have recently been completed - on the Cortes of Cadiz of 1812, War and Society in early modern Europe and the relationship between Poland, northern Europe and Spain in the early modern period.

García Hernán was appointed to the board of the Comisión Española de Historia Militar in 2006. In the following year he was elected to the Real Academia de Historia. In 2010 he was made a fellow of the Ambrosiana Academy of Milan (la Academia Ambrosiana de Milán).

== Recent works ==
- The Spanish Monarchy and Safavid Persia in the Early Modern Period Politics, War and Religion ISBN 978-84-7274-318-2
- PRESENCIA GERMÁNICA EN LA MILICIA ESPAÑOLA ISBN 978-84-9091-050-4
- A database on the 'Misión de Irlanda' can be found on Digital CSIC
- Ireland and Spain in the reign of Philip II; Four Courts Press, Dublin 2009, pp. 392; ISBN 978-1-84682-166-0

== Monograph studies in Spanish ==
- Battle of Kinsale. Study and Documents from the Spanish Archives, with the collaboration of Ciaran Brady and Declan M. Downey, Ministerio de Defensa-Albatros, Valencia 2013; ISBN 978-8472743069
- Ignacio de Loyola, Taurus, Madrid 2013; ISBN 978-8-430-60211-7
- Consejero de Ambos Mundos. Vida y obra de Juan de Solórzano Pereira (1575-1655); Fundación Mapfre, Madrid 2007, pp. 421; ISBN 978-84-9844-056-0
- Irlanda y el rey prudente. Segunda Parte; Laberinto, Madrid 2003; pp. 278; ISBN 84-8483-089-6
- Milicia General en la Edad Moderna. El Batallón de don Rafael de la Barreda y Figueroa; Ministerio de Defensa, Madrid 2003, pp. 320; ISBN 84-9781-061-9
- La cuestión irlandesa en la política internacional de Felipe II; Universidad Complutense, Madrid 2002, Ref. Book and CD-Rom. pp 719; ISBN 84-669-1063-8
- Políticos de la Monarquía Hispánica, 1469-1700. Ensayo y Diccionario; Fundación Mapfre Tavera, Madrid 2002; pp. 888; ISBN 84-8479-025-8
- Irlanda y el rey prudente. Primera Parte; Laberinto, Madrid 2000; pp. 286; ISBN 84-87482-68-6
- La acción diplomática de Francisco de Borja al servicio del Pontificado, 1571-1572; Generalitat de Valencia, Valencia 2000; pp. 562; ISBN 84-482-2367-5
- Francisco de Borja, Grande de España; Institutió Alfons el Magnànim, Valencia 1999; pp. 354; ISBN 978-84-7822-275-9
- La armada española en la monarquía de Felipe II y la defensa del Mediterráneo; Tempo, Madrid, 1995; pp. 181; ISBN 84-88381-11-5
- With David García Hernán, Lepanto: el día después; Actas, Madrid 1999, pp. 191; ISBN 84-87863-77-9

== Edited volumes ==
- with M. Carmen Lario Oñate, The Irish Communities in Spain and the Cortes of Cadiz, 1812 (Forthcoming, Albatros, Valencia 2013)
- with María del Pilar Ryan, Francisco de Borja y su tiempo. Política, Religión y cultura en la Edad Moderna; Valencia-Roma, IHSI, 2011, pp. 800 ISBN 978-88-7041-374-8.

with Igor Pérez Tostado, Irlanda y el Mundo Atlántico. Movilidad, participación e intercambio cultural; Albatros, Valencia 2010; pp. 355; ISBN 978-84-7274-287-1.

- Monumenta Borgia VII (1551-1566). Sanctus Franciscus Borgia Quartus Gandiae Dux et Societatis Iesu Praepositus Generalis Tertius. Monumenta Historica Societatis Iesu, vol. 157; Instituto Histórico de la Compañía de Jesús-Generalitat Valenciana, Valencia-Rome 2009; pp. 858; ISBN 978-88-7041-157-7
- with Oscar Recio Morales, Extranjeros en el ejército: Militares irlandeses en la sociedad española, 1580–1818; Ministerio de Defensa, Madrid 2007; pp. 422; ISBN 978-84-9781-342-6;
- with Davide Maffi, Guerra y Sociedad en la Monarquía Hispánica. Política, Estrategia y Cultura en la Edad Moderna (1500-1700);2 volúmenes; Ediciones del Laberinto, Fundación Mapfre, CSIC, Madrid 2006; vol I pp. 1054 and vol.II pp. 1024; ISBN 978-84-8483-224-9
- with José María Blanco Núñez and Pablo de Castro Martín, Poder Terrestre y Poder Naval en la época de la batalla de Trafalgar; Ministerio de Defensa, Madrid 2006; pp. 702; ISBN 84-9781-269-7
- Monumenta Borgia VI (1478-1551). Sanctus Franciscus Borgia Quartus Gandiae Dux et Societatis Iesu Praepositus Generalis Tertius. Monumenta Historica Societatis Iesu, vol. 156; Instituto Histórico de la Compañía de Jesús-Generalitat Valenciana, Valencia-Rome, 2003; pp. 752; ISBN 84-482-3354-9/ 88-7041-156-7
- with Miguel Ángel de Bunes, Oscar Recio Morales, Bernardo J. García García, Irlanda y la Monarquía Hispánica. Kinsale, 1601-2001. Política, Guerra, Exilio y Religión; Universidad de Alcalá- CSIC. Biblioteca de Historia 51, Madrid 202; pp. 567

== Papers in English ==
- "The price of spying at the Battle of Lepanto", in Eurasian Studies, II/2 (2003), pp. 227–250
- "The Persian Gentlemen at the Spanish Court in the Early Seventeenth Century", in Rudi Matthee and Jorge Flores (eds), Portugal the Persian Gulf and Safavid Persia, Peeter, Lovanii 2011, pp. 283–300, ISBN 978-90-429-2448-2
- "Irish clerics in Madrid, 1598-1665", in Thomas O´Connor – Mary Lyons(ed.), Irish Communities in Early-Moderns Europe, Four Courts Press, Dublín 2006, 267-293. ISBN 1-85182-993-8
- "Philip II´s forgotten armada", in Hiram Morgan (ed.), The Battle of Kinsale, Wordwell Ltd., Cork 2004, 45-58. ISBN 1-869857-70-4
- "The Holy See, the Spanish Monarchy and Safavid Persia in the Sixteenth Century: Some Aspects of the Involvement of the Society of Jesus", in Willem Floor & Edmund Herzig (eds.), Iran and the World in the Safavid Age, I.B.Tauris, London-New York 2012, pp. 506, pp. 181–206; ISBN 978-1-850-43930-1

== National and international awards and prizes ==
- Finalist in the National Award for History 2007 (Premio Nacional de Historia 2007) for the book Consejo de Ambos Mundo. Vida y obra de Juan de Solórzano Pereira
- Prize for the Outstanding Study of Military History 2002 (Premio Ejército de Tierra). Granted by: Ministerio de Defensa. Title of Book: Milicia General en la Edad Moderna: El batallón de Don Rafael de la Barreda y Figueroa
- The Roberto Bellarmino Prize for the Outstanding Doctorate in International History 1998 (Premio Internacional de Doctorado Roberto Bellarmino). Granted by: Universidad Gregoriana de Roma
- The Premio Virgen del Mar 1994. Granted by: The Ministerio de Defensa. Book: La armada española en la monarquía de Felipe II y la defensa del Mediterráneo
- Prize for the Outstanding Study in Military History 1993 (Premio Ejército de Tierra). Granted by: Ministerio de Defensa. Title of Book: La proyección política-militar de la victoria de Lepanto
