= Upmann =

Upmann may refer to:

== People ==
- Germán Upmann (1910—1998), Cuban tennis player.
- Hermann Dietrich Upmann (1816–1894), German banker

== Other uses ==
- H. Upmann, Cuban brand of cigars
- H. Upmann & Co., bank based in Cuba
