= Garbade =

Garbade as a surname may refer to:

- Theodore Garbade (1873–1961), German merchant and banker in Cuba
- Daniel Garbade (born 1957), Swiss painter, illustrator, art director and publisher
