= Lloret de Mar =

- Municipality
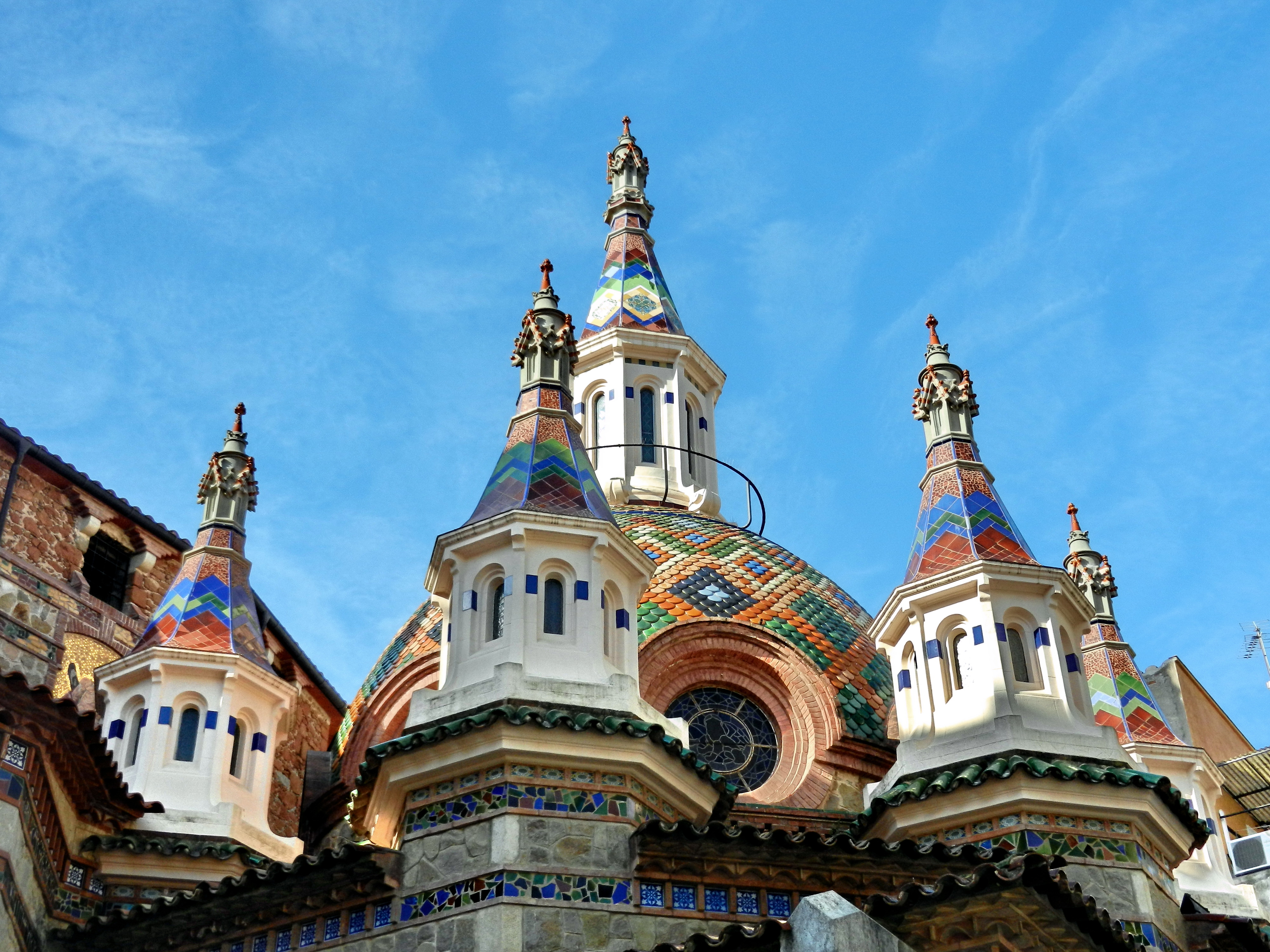
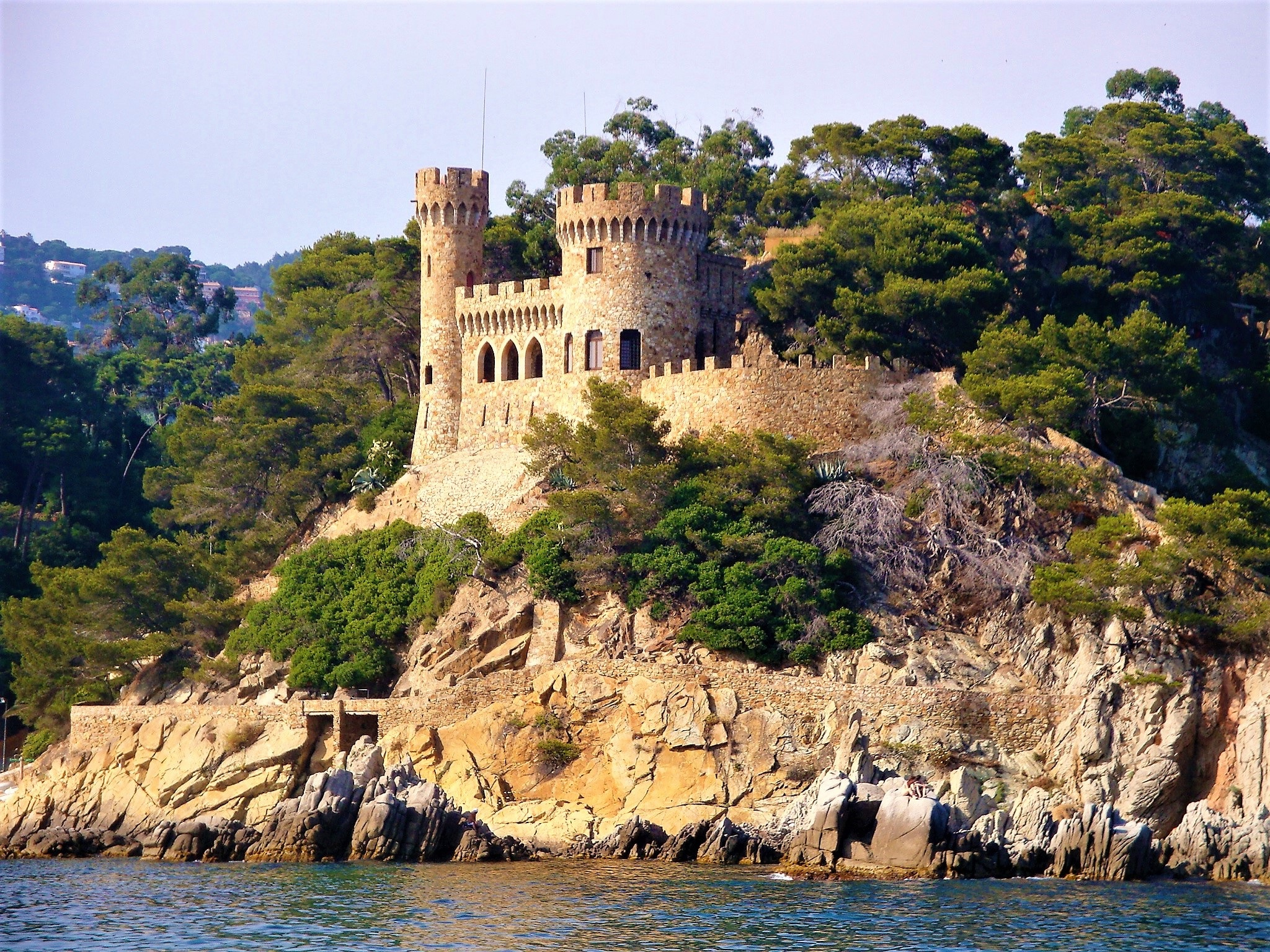
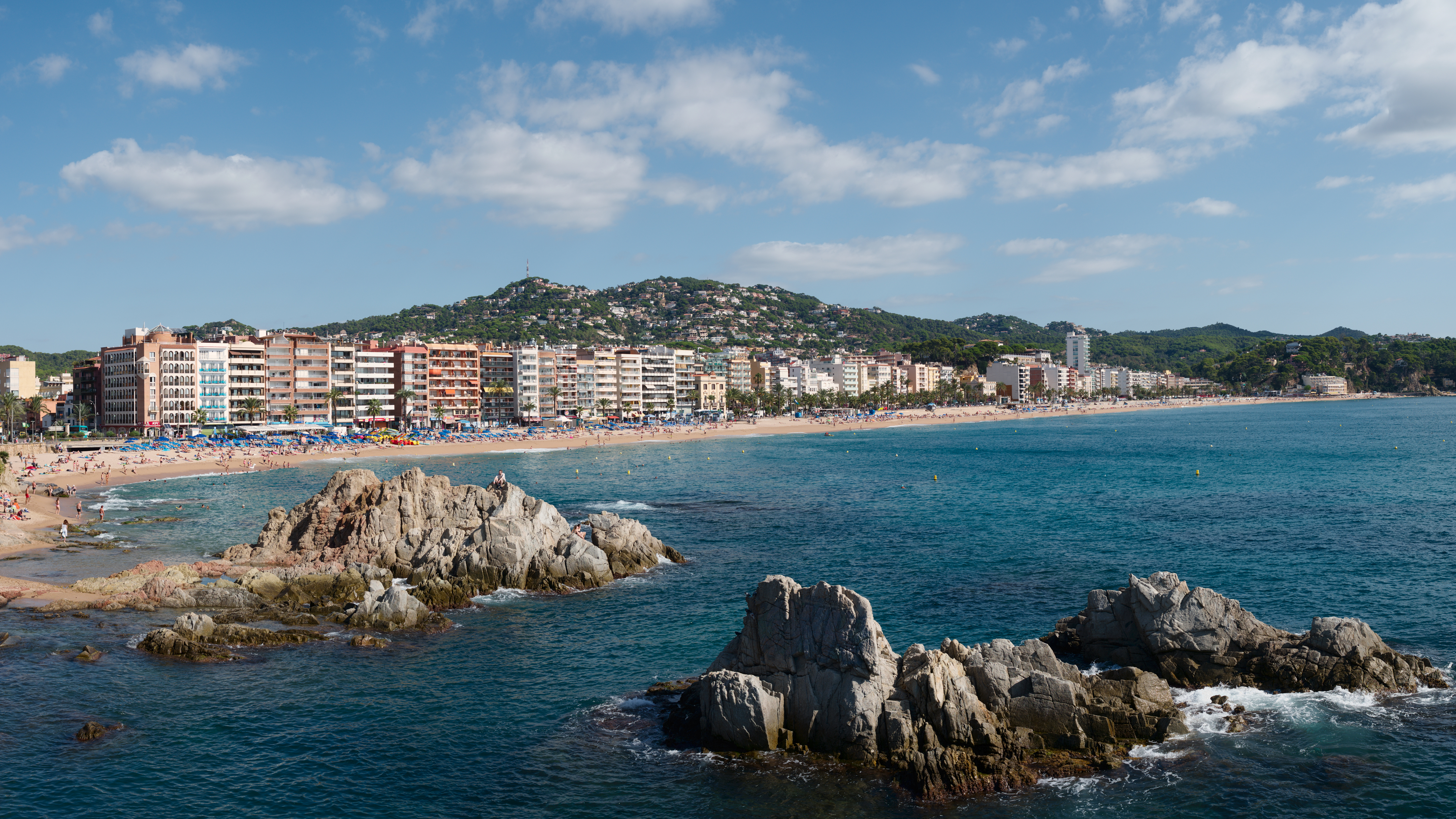
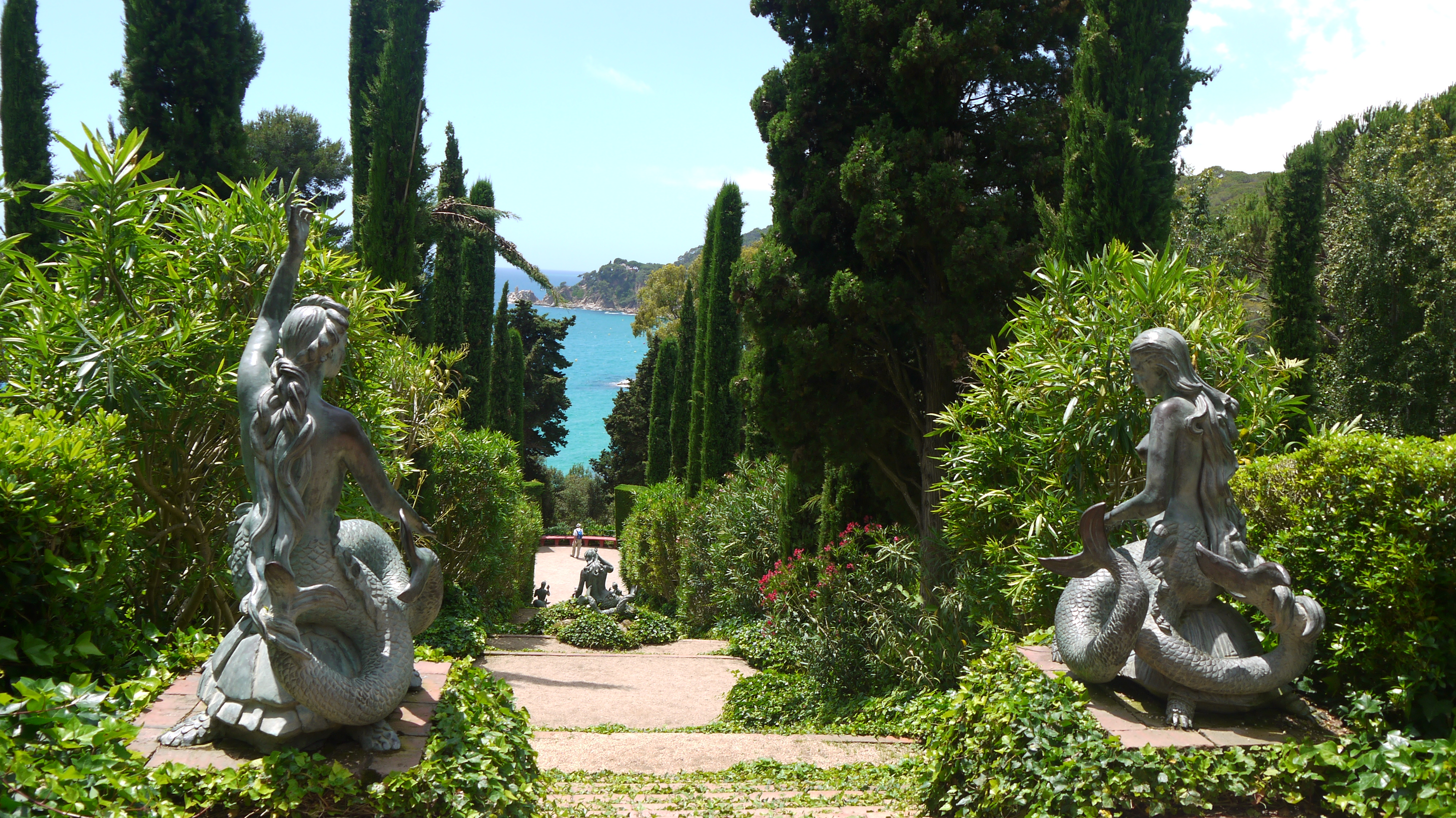
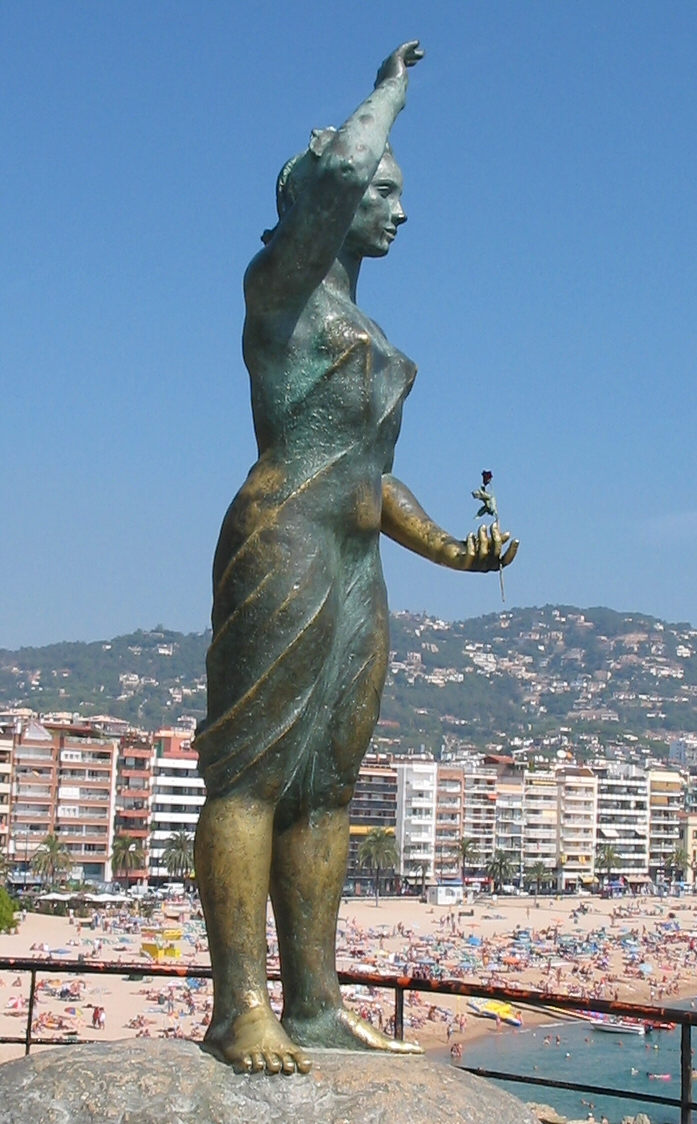
- Church of Sant Romà Castell d'en Plaja Panoramic view of Lloret de Mar Santa Clotilde Gardens La Dona Marinera

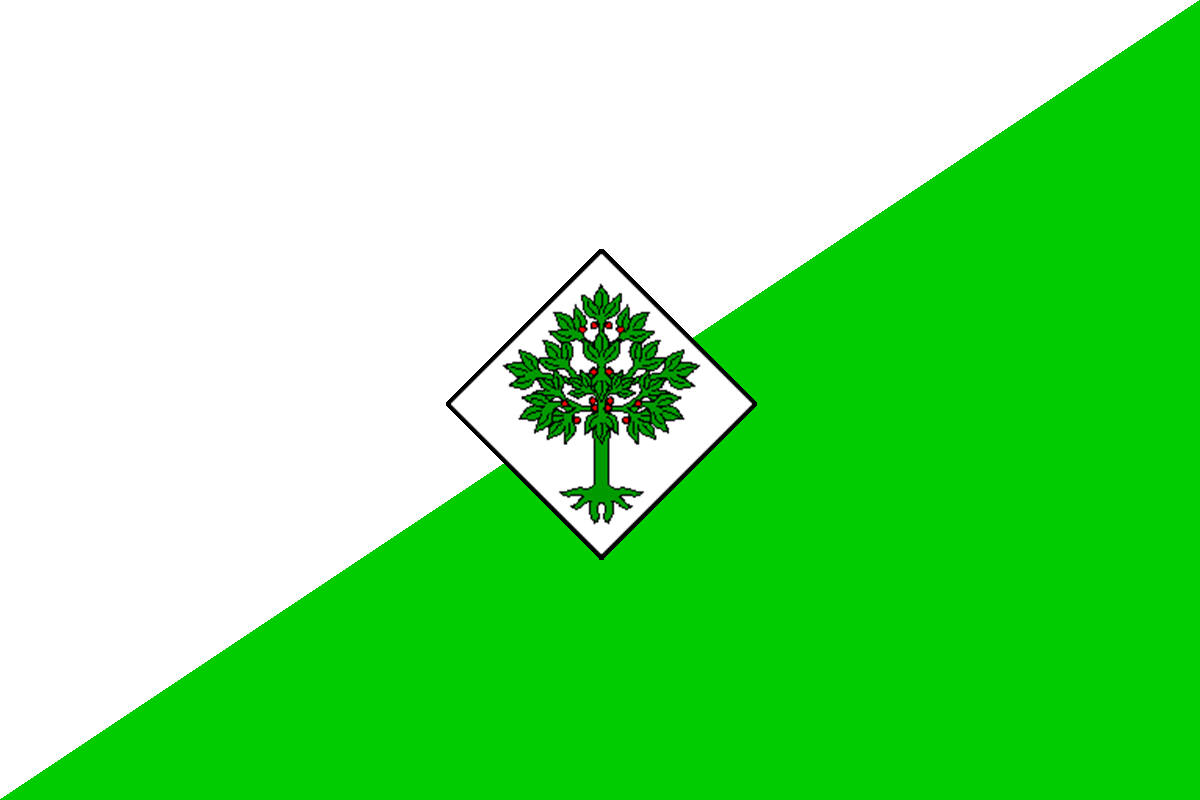
- Flag Coat of arms
- Nickname: Lloret
- Interactive map of Lloret de Mar
- Location within Catalonia Location within Spain
- Coordinates: 41°42′N 2°50′E
- Country: Spain
- Autonomous Community: Catalonia
- Province: Girona
- Comarca: Selva

Government
  - Mayor: Jaume Dulsat Rodríguez (2015)

Area
  - Total: 48.7 km^{2} (18.8 sq mi)
- Elevation: 5 m (16 ft)

Population (2025-01-01)
  - Total: 43,000
  - Density: 880/km^{2} (2,300/sq mi)
- Demonym(s): Lloretenc, lloretenca
- Time zone: UTC+1 (CET)
  - Summer (DST): UTC+2 (CEST)
- Postal code: 17310
- Website: lloret.cat

Lloret de Mar (Catalan: [ʎuˈɾɛd də ˈmaɾ]; Spanish: [ʎoˈɾed de ˈmaɾ]) is a Mediterranean coastal town in Catalonia, Spain. It is 40 kilometres (25 miles) south of Girona and 75 kilometres (47 miles) northeast of Barcelona. With a population of 38,402 in 2021, it is the second largest town in the Selva comarca of Catalonia.

Lloret de Mar attracts summer visitors on package tours. Its main beach (length: 1,630 m; width: 45 m; small, gravel-like stones) is one of the most popular Costa Brava beaches, and is consistently awarded the Blue Flag for cleanliness.

== Geography ==
The town of Lloret de Mar covers 48.9 km^{2} (18.9 square miles). It has 9 km (6 mi) of coastline and 27 km^{2} (10 sq mi) of forest. It borders Vidreres and Maçanet de la Selva to the west, the Mediterranean Sea to the east, Tossa de Mar to the north, and Blanes to the south.

=== Climate ===
Lloret de Mar has a climate that is on the border between a humid subtropical climate (Köppen Cfa) and a coastal Mediterranean climate (Köppen Csa), with the former very rarely seen anywhere in Southwestern Europe; temperatures are always much milder due to thermal effect moderator of the sea. The summer dry period normally lasts three months and the maximum rainfall occurs in the autumn months.

Climate data for Climate parameters, average maximum and minimum temperatures in Lloret de Mar for the period 1997 to 2001
Month	Jan	Feb	Mar	Apr	May	Jun	Jul	Aug	Sep	Oct	Nov	Dec	Year
Mean daily maximum °C (°F)	14.8 (58.6)	16.9 (62.4)	20.1 (68.2)	19.9 (67.8)	24.1 (75.4)	27.9 (82.2)	30 (86)	30.8 (87.4)	27.5 (81.5)	23.0 (73.4)	17.4 (63.3)	15.4 (59.7)	22.1 (71.8)
Mean daily minimum °C (°F)	4.5 (40.1)	4.6 (40.3)	6.6 (43.9)	7.5 (45.5)	11.9 (53.4)	15.4 (59.7)	17.0 (62.6)	18.2 (64.8)	15.4 (59.7)	12.2 (54.0)	6.8 (44.2)	4.6 (40.3)	10.2 (50.4)
Average precipitation mm (inches)	56.2 (2.21)	13.6 (0.54)	16.9 (0.67)	42.2 (1.66)	34.2 (1.35)	32.9 (1.30)	28.4 (1.12)	23.8 (0.94)	62.2 (2.45)	33.2 (1.31)	68.5 (2.70)	55.2 (2.17)	467.3 (18.40)
Source: Agenda21

== History ==
There are historical remains of Iberian and Roman civilisations at various archeological sites. The first written references to Lloret de Mar can be found in documents from 966 as Loredo from the Latin word "lauretum" (bay laurel). Like many Mediterranean coastal towns, Lloret was frequently invaded by the Saracens in the Middle Ages. It is said that the traditional Ball de Plaça (the Dance in the Town Square) dates from this era.

Until the 15th century, the town's centre was located one kilometre (0.6 miles) inland, next to the Chapel of Les Alegries (the town's main church before the Church of Sant Romà was built) to protect itself from attacks from English, French, Turkish and Algerian pirates. Lloret's port became commercially important in the 18th century. It no longer exists but the Garriga Houses built by Indianos (Indians), rich returning Spanish immigrants to the Americas, remind us of this affluent era. The high economic level that had been achieved in certain sectors of the population of Lloret led to the demolition of the old houses and the rise of small neoclassical palaces, modernist or eclectic. The houses of the Paseo del Mar, San Pedro Street and the Plaza de España. In the first decade of the twentieth century, the first holiday makers arrived in Lloret. In 1918 the first summer villas began to be built, such as the Indian house of Emilio Heydrich in 1921; the first hotel was opened in 1920, the hotel "Costa Brava" . But the Spanish Civil War and the postwar period brought economic restrictions and difficulties and stopped the incipient tourist activity of Lloret. All in all, the first vacationers who came from the Barcelona area soon arrived and were generally well-placed textile manufacturers or similar occupants.

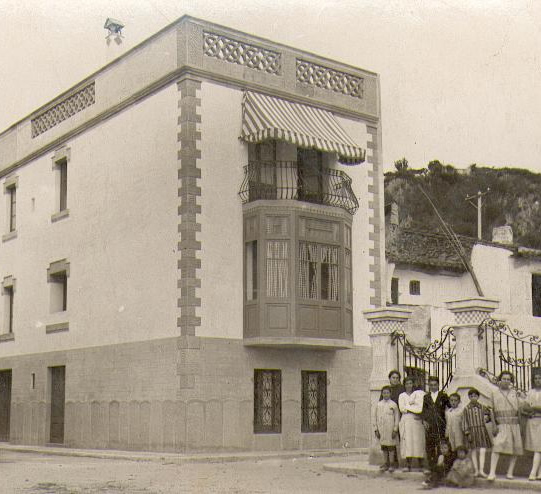
Casa Emilio Heydrich Martinez

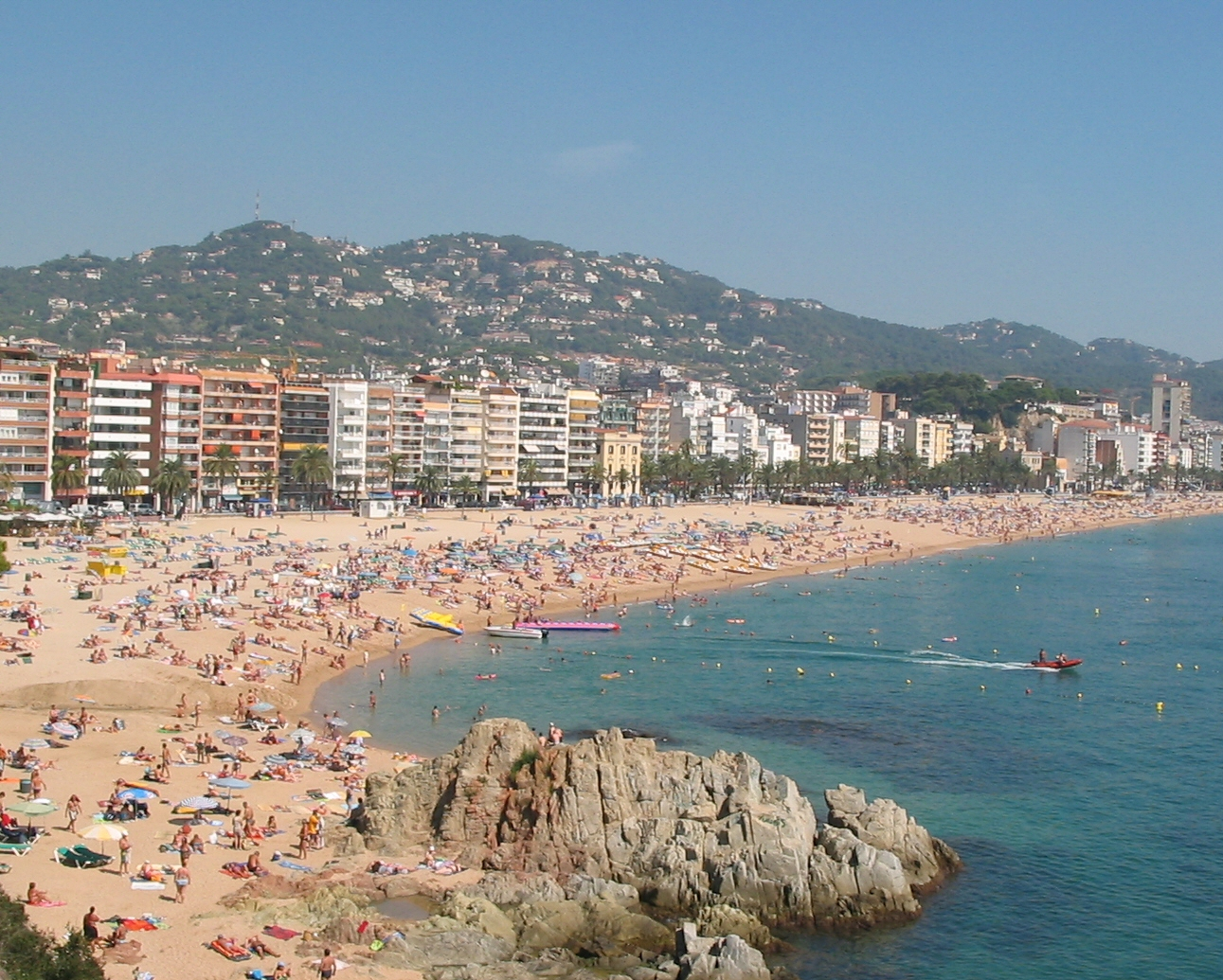
Lloret de Mar's main beach

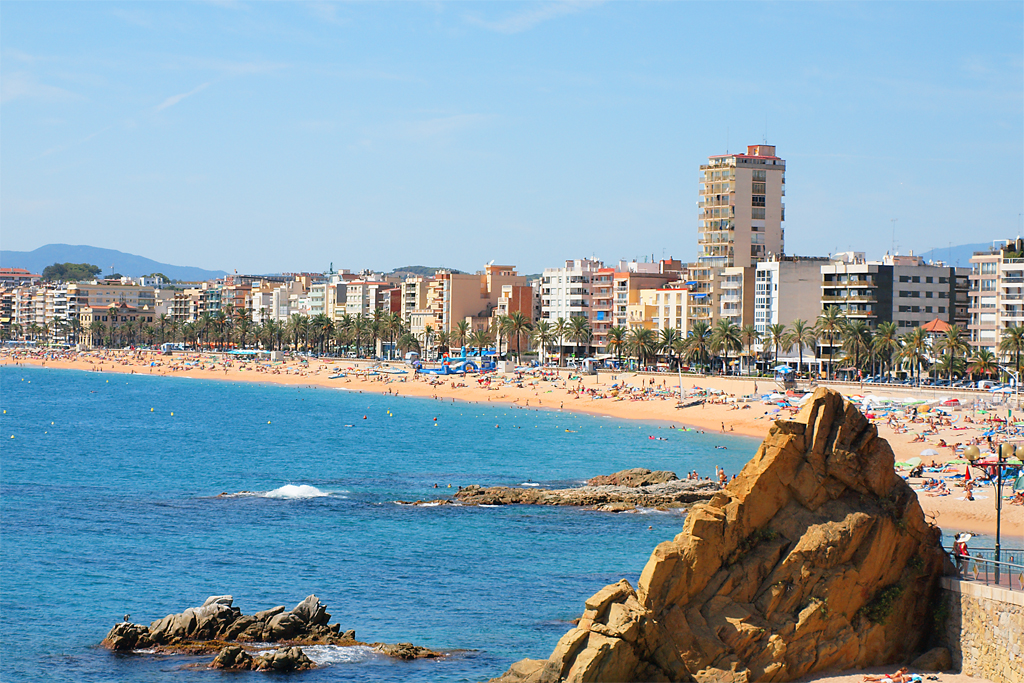
A view of main beach in Lloret de Mar

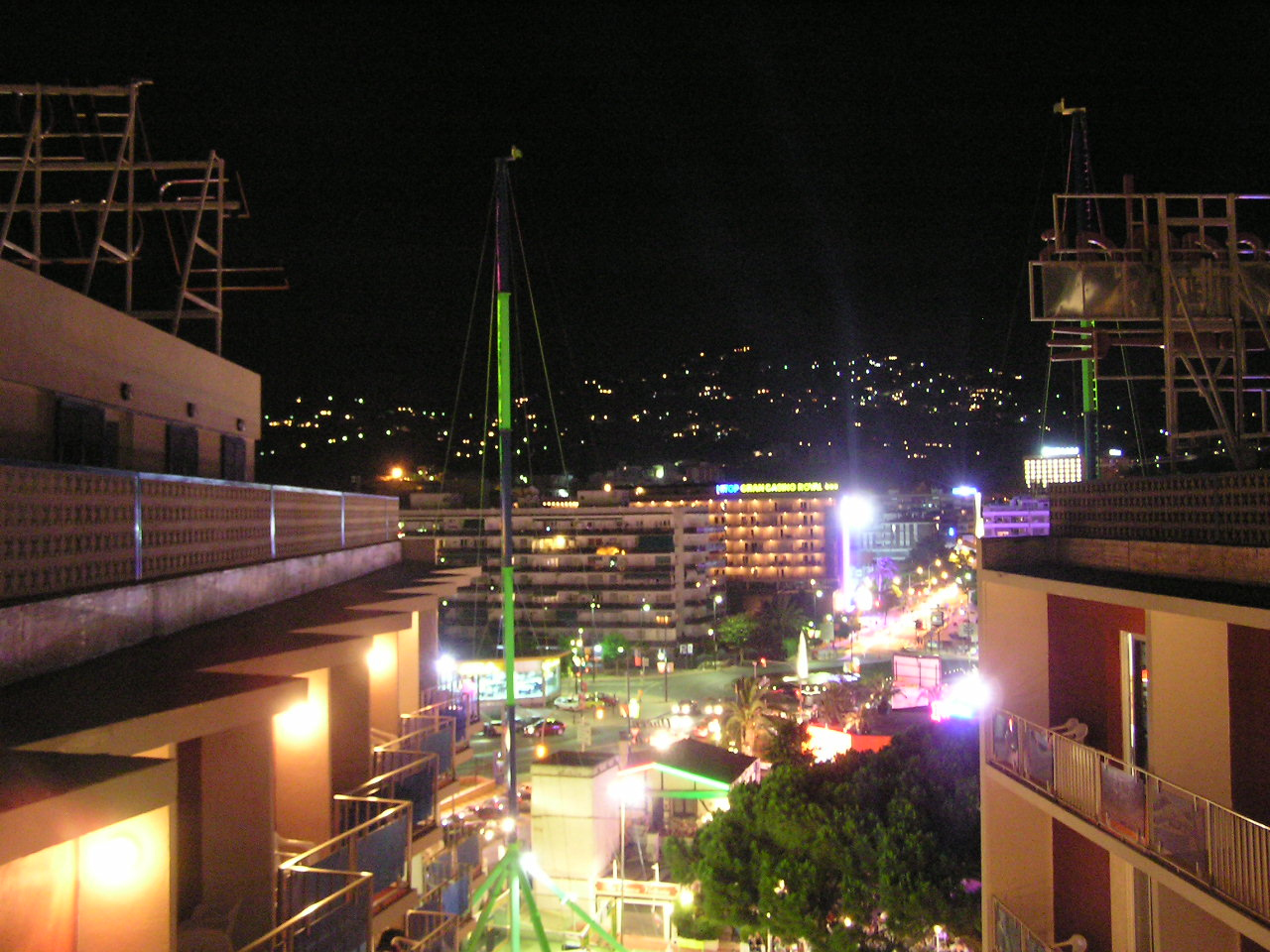
Lloret de Mar at night

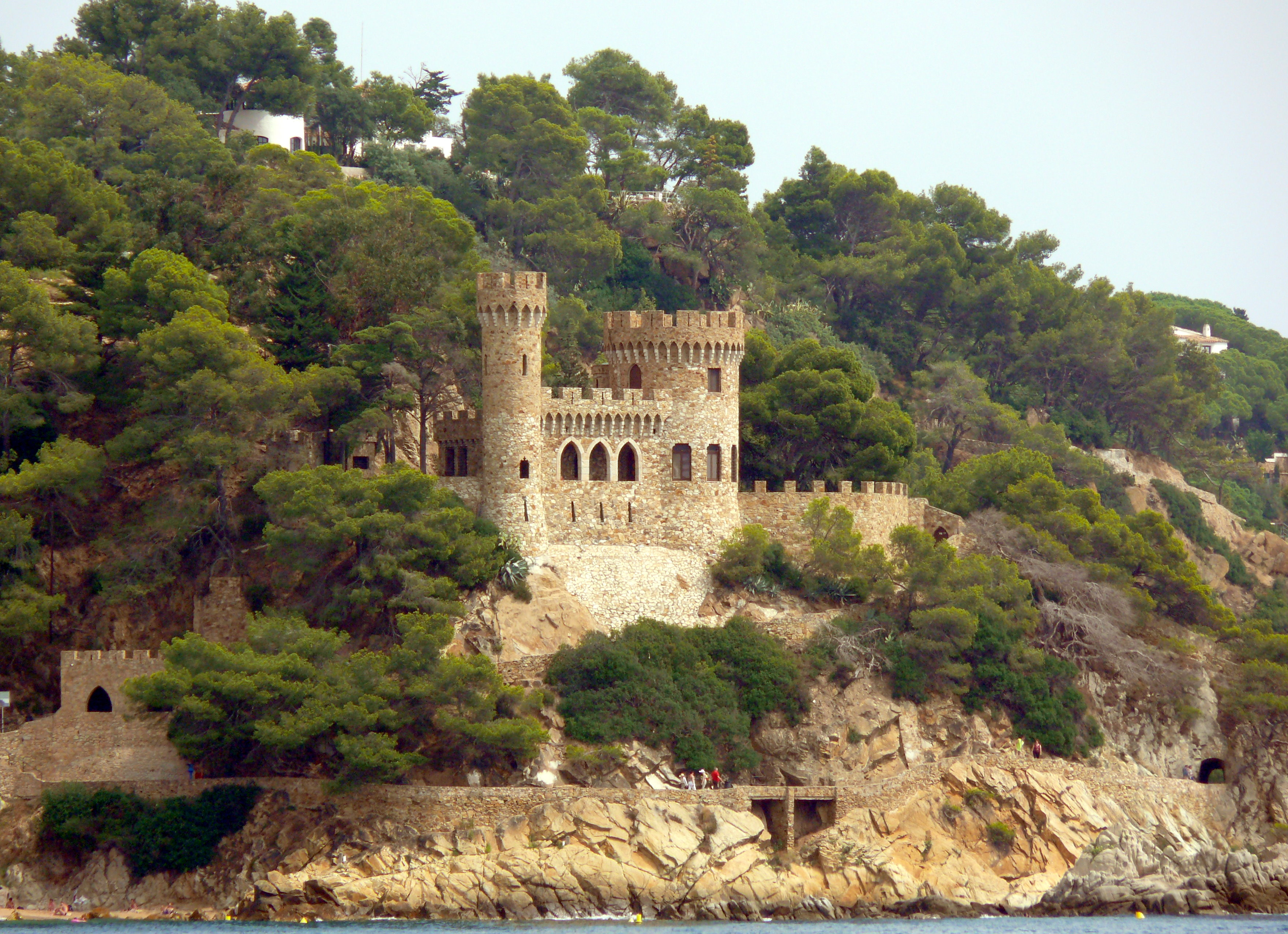
Castell d'en Plaja

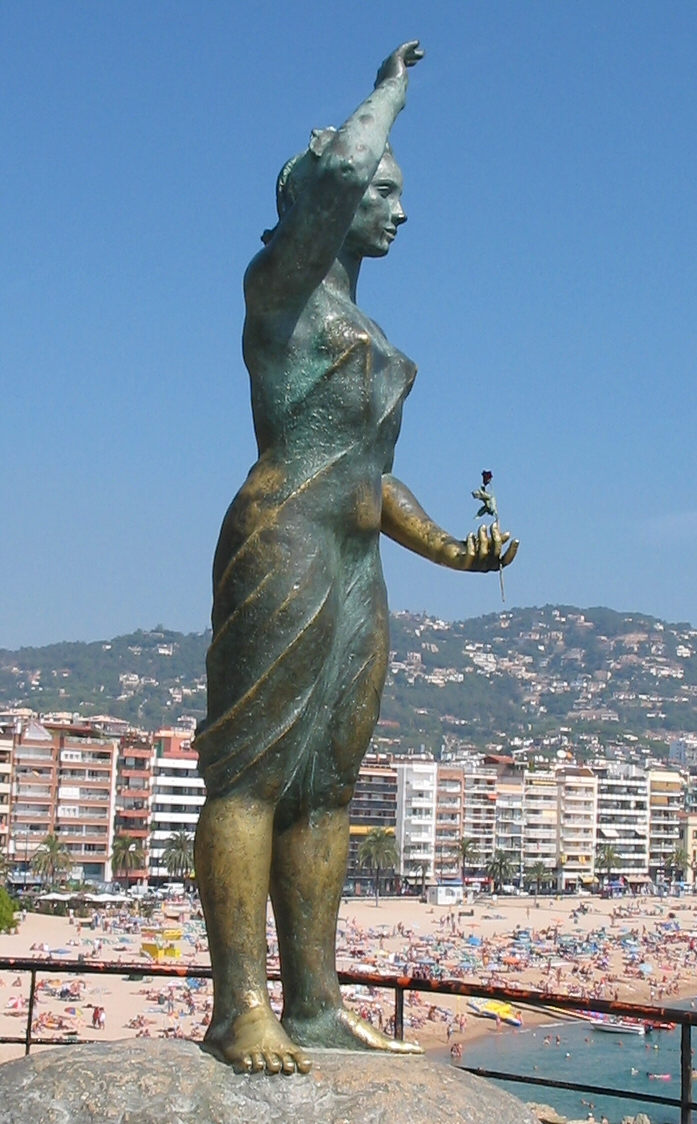
Monument to the Fisherman's Wife

== Sites of cultural interest ==
- Church of Sant Romà: Gothic church finished in 1522 built as a refuge from attacks from Turkish and Algerian pirates. Large-scale restoration work carried out in the early 20th century with money from the returned Americanos has converted it into a building with Byzantine, Moorish, Renaissance and Modernist influences.
- Castle of Sant Joan: Medieval castle from the 11th century used to defend Lloret against any attacks from the sea such as that of the Genovese fleet in 1356 and during England's war on Spain and France in 1805. The fortress is said to have been operational until the 17th century. Only the castle's tower remains (restored in 1992) and offers an excellent view of the surrounding area.
- Monument to the Fisherman's Wife: Bronze sculpture found at the end of Lloret beach erected in 1966 to commemorate Lloret de Mar's Millennium. It is considered to be one of the town's most emblematic symbols. Legend states that touching the sculpture's foot while looking out at the horizon will make your wishes come true.
- Santa Clotilde gardens: Gardens designed in an Italian Renaissance style by Nicolau Rubió i Tuduri. Situated on top of a cliff offering impressive views over the sea.
- Modernist cemetery
- Iberian settlements at Puig de Castellet.
- Iberian settlements at Montbarbat.
- Sanctuary of Sant Pere del Bosc.
- Angel monument.
- Oratory of the Mare de Déu de Gràcia.
- Chapel of Santa Cristina.
- Chapel of Les Alegries
- Chapel of Sant Quirze
- Maritime Museum - Can Garriga

== Nature ==
=== Beaches and coves ===
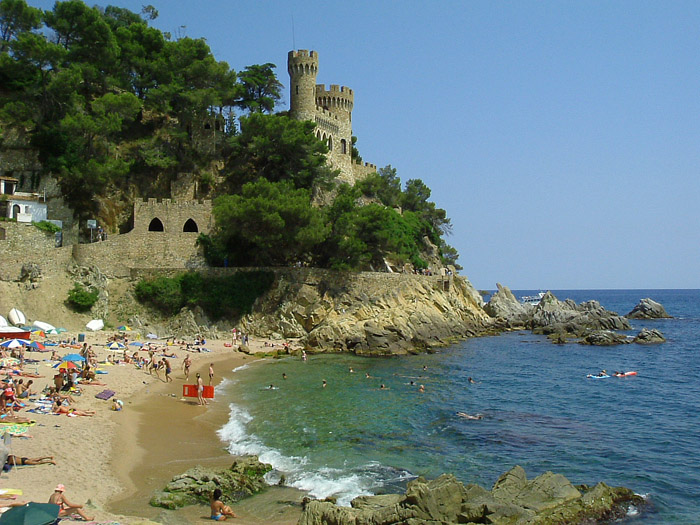
Sa Caleta

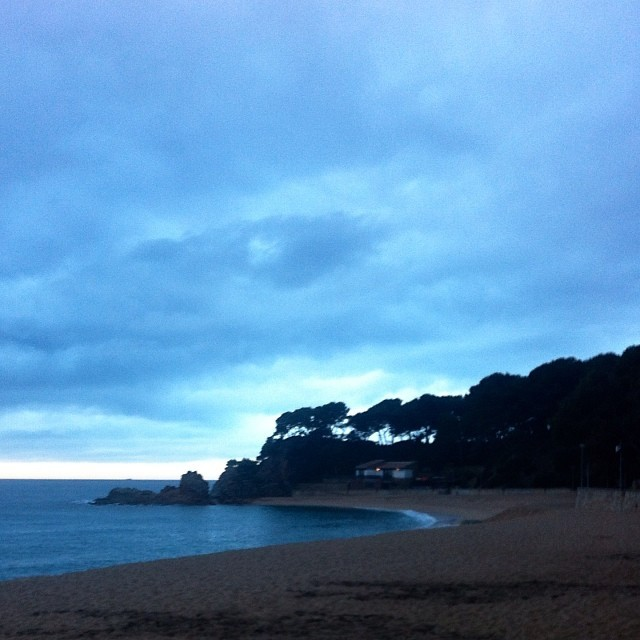
Fenals Beach

Lloret de Mar has been awarded the Blue Flag seal of quality for Lloret, Fenals, Sa Boadella and Santa Cristina beaches.

- Lloret beach: Lloret beach is located in the municipal district of Lloret de Mar (county of La Selva), on the southern Costa Brava. This coarse, white sand beach is 1630 metres long with a 10% gradient. It is situated in Lloret de Mar town centre and can be reached by the GI-682 (Blanes-Lloret) road, the C-32 motorway (Malgrat-Blanes-Lloret exit) and the AP-7 motorway (Lloret C-63 exit). The beach is a single unit but is divided into three sections with names inherited from the local fishermen: "Es Trajo de Vilavall" (towards the Fenals side), "Es Trajo d’en Reiner" (the central section) and "Es Trajo de Venècia" (towards the Sa Caleta side). The beach has been awarded the Blue Flag seal of quality.
- Fenals beach: Fenals beach is located in the municipal district of Lloret de Mar (county of La Selva), on the southern Costa Brava, between Sa Boadella cove and Lloret beach. This coarse sand beach is 700 metres long with a 10% gradient. It is situated in a semi-urban area of Lloret de Mar and can be reached along the GI-682 road (Blanes-Lloret). There is an inter-urban bus service that stops at the beach. On the side of the beach closer to Sa Boadella there is a pine grove that begins at the Racó d'en Sureda spot. On the other side of the beach, in the form of a very open bay with deep water, stands the Castle of Sant Joan on a promontory that is the highest point on the Lloret coastline. The beach has been awarded the Blue Flag seal of quality.
- Cala Boadella: Sa Boadella cove is located in the municipal district of Lloret de Mar (county of La Selva), on the southern Costa Brava, between Santa Cristina and Fenals beaches. This coarse sand beach is 250 metres long with a 10% gradient. It is situated in the outskirts of Lloret de Mar and can be reached along the GI-682 road (Blanes-Lloret). Vehicle access to the beach is not allowed; parking facilities are located 200 metres from the beach. The beach is surrounded by cliffs and a thick pine grove. Santa Clotilde Gardens are situated at the top of the cliffs on the left-hand side of the beach, with views of the coastline. At the foot of these cliffs, between Des Bot island and En Sureda point, there is an area scattered with islets that is used by scuba divers. The cove is split by the Sa Roca des Mig formation, forming two beaches: Sa Cova (the Cave, although there is no cave there) and Sa Boadella. In fact, the name Sa Cova (on the side closer to Santa Cristina beach) is barely used today and the entire beach is known as Sa Boadella. The beach has been awarded the Blue Flag seal of quality. A few decades ago there was a small designated area in the northernmost part of the beach for nudists. Today, the entire beach is used by nudists although non-nudists are also welcome.
- Santa Cristina beach: Santa Cristina beach is located in the municipal district of Lloret de Mar (county of La Selva), on the southern Costa Brava. This fine sand beach is 450 metres long with a 10% gradient. It is delimited by the Punta de Llevant (Eastern Point) and by the Es Canó rocks. The Es Canó rocks form a small gulf that serves as a shelter when the south-westerly wind blows. This spot, known as Es Racó de Garbí, is situated at the start of the curve that forms Sant Cristina beach, ending up at the Racó de Llevant spot, at the foot of some pine-filled crags. The path that leads to the beach ends up at the chapel of Sant Cristina. The beach has been awarded the Blue Flag seal of quality.
- Treumal beach: Treumal beach is located on the boundary of the municipal districts of Lloret de Mar and Blanes (county of La Selva), on the southern Costa Brava. This fine sand beach is 400 metres long with a 10% gradient. It can be reached along the GI-682 road (Blanes-Lloret), the C-32 motorway (Malgrat-Blanes-Lloret exit), the AP-7 motorway (Exit 9 Lloret) and the C-63 (Vidreres county road). The closest parking facilities are at Santa Cristina beach. This beach is a prolongation of Santa Cristina beach and is surrounded by a leafy pine wood. The two beaches are separated by a rock formation called La Punta des Canó.
- Canyelles beach: Canyelles beach is located in the municipal district of Lloret de Mar (county of La Selva), on the southern Costa Brava. This coarse, white sand beach is 450 metres long with a 5% gradient. It can be reached along the GI-682 road (Blanes-Lloret-Tossa), the C-32 motorway (Malgrat-Blanes-Lloret exit), the AP-7 motorway (Exit 9 Lloret) and the C-63 (Vidreres county road). An inter-urban bus service operates in July and August. The beach is situated outside Lloret de Mar town centre, next to the Canyelles housing development. On the right-hand side of the beach there is a small marina run by the Cala Canyelles Yacht Club. The beach is divided into two sections by a rock formation called Ses Roques des Mig. The section that stretches from these rocks to the left-hand side of the beach is called Sa Somera.
- Sa Caleta: It is located next to Lloret beach and stretches below a castle.
- Cala Banys: This rocky cove is commonly used for fishing and snorkelling. It can be reached on foot from Lloret beach or by car, parking at the Castle of Sant Joan.
- Cala Morisca
- Cala Gran
- Cala Tortuga
- Cala d'en Trons
- Cala dels Frares

=== Gardens ===
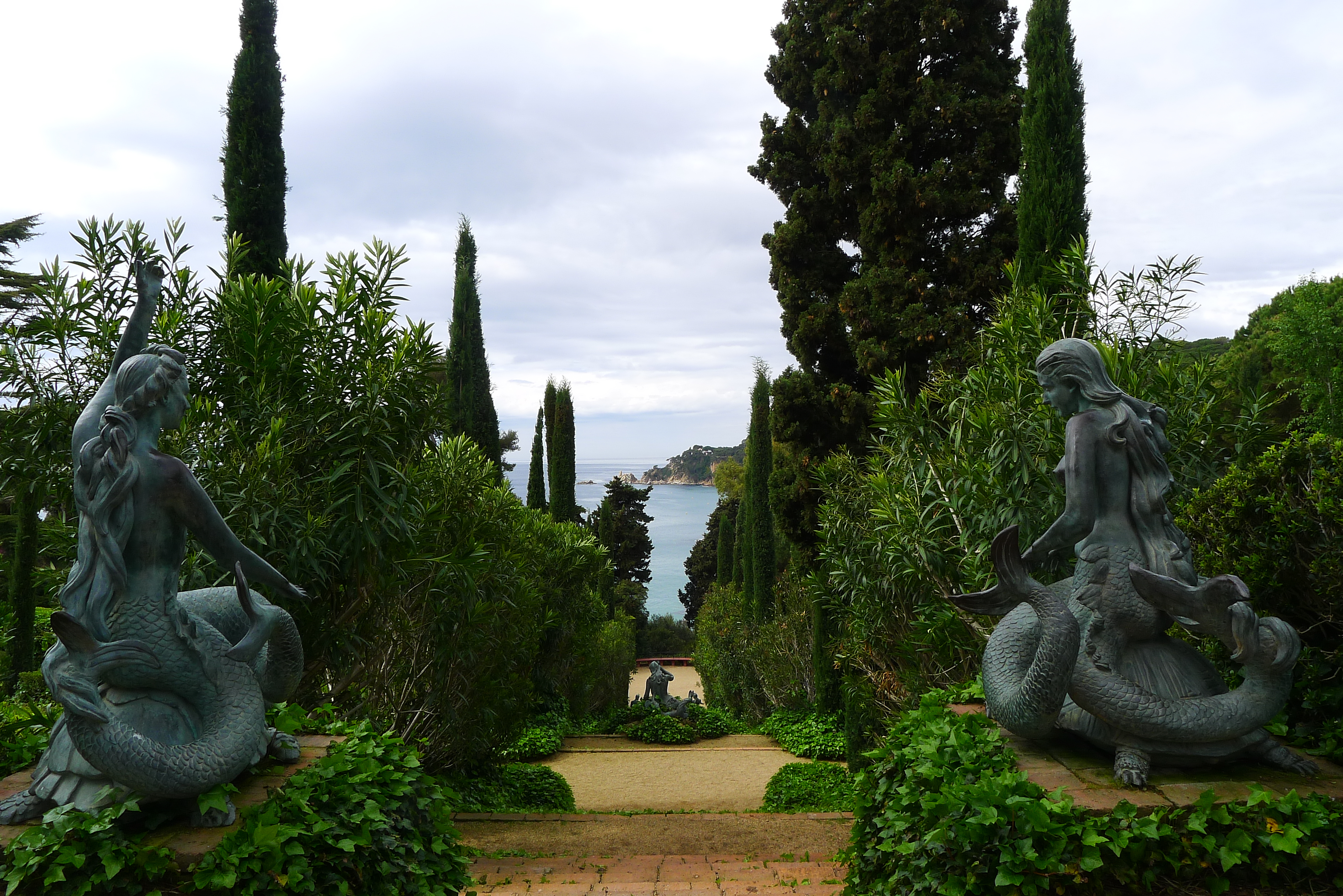
Sirens of Santa Clotilde Gardens. Lloret de Mar

Santa Clotilde Gardens, designed at the turn of the 20th century in the noucentisme style, are probably the finest example of contemporary Catalan landscape gardening. In 1919, Doctor Raül Roviralta i Astoul, Marquis of Roviralta, commissioned the architect and noucentista landscaper Nicolau Maria Rubió i Tudurí to build the house and gardens of Santa Clotilde, overlooking Sa Boadella cove. Set on a clifftop with stunning sea views, the gardens are characterised by their wide variety of plants in contrast to an absence of flowers.

=== Protected areas ===
==== Biotope ====
In order to balance the exploitation of resources with the existing fishing capacity and the maintenance of marine ecosystems, on the initiative of various fishermen's guilds and the Directorate General for Sea Fishing, in recent years a series of artificial reefs have been installed in various places in Catalonia and in 1994 the biotope was created in Lloret de Mar. The artificial reef covers 150 hectares and stretches from Punta des Bullents (Cala Canyelles) to Racó des Bernat (Lloret de Mar), with a bathymetric range of between 15 and 25 metres. The reef is composed of four series of protective modules placed perpendicular to the coastline and forty beehive-shaped production structures placed facing Canyelles beach. The initial goal of the Lloret de Mar biotope was to increase the biological productivity of the system, to revive and develop artisan fishing, and to protect the Posidonia Oceanica meadows.

== Art and culture ==
=== Museums and collections ===
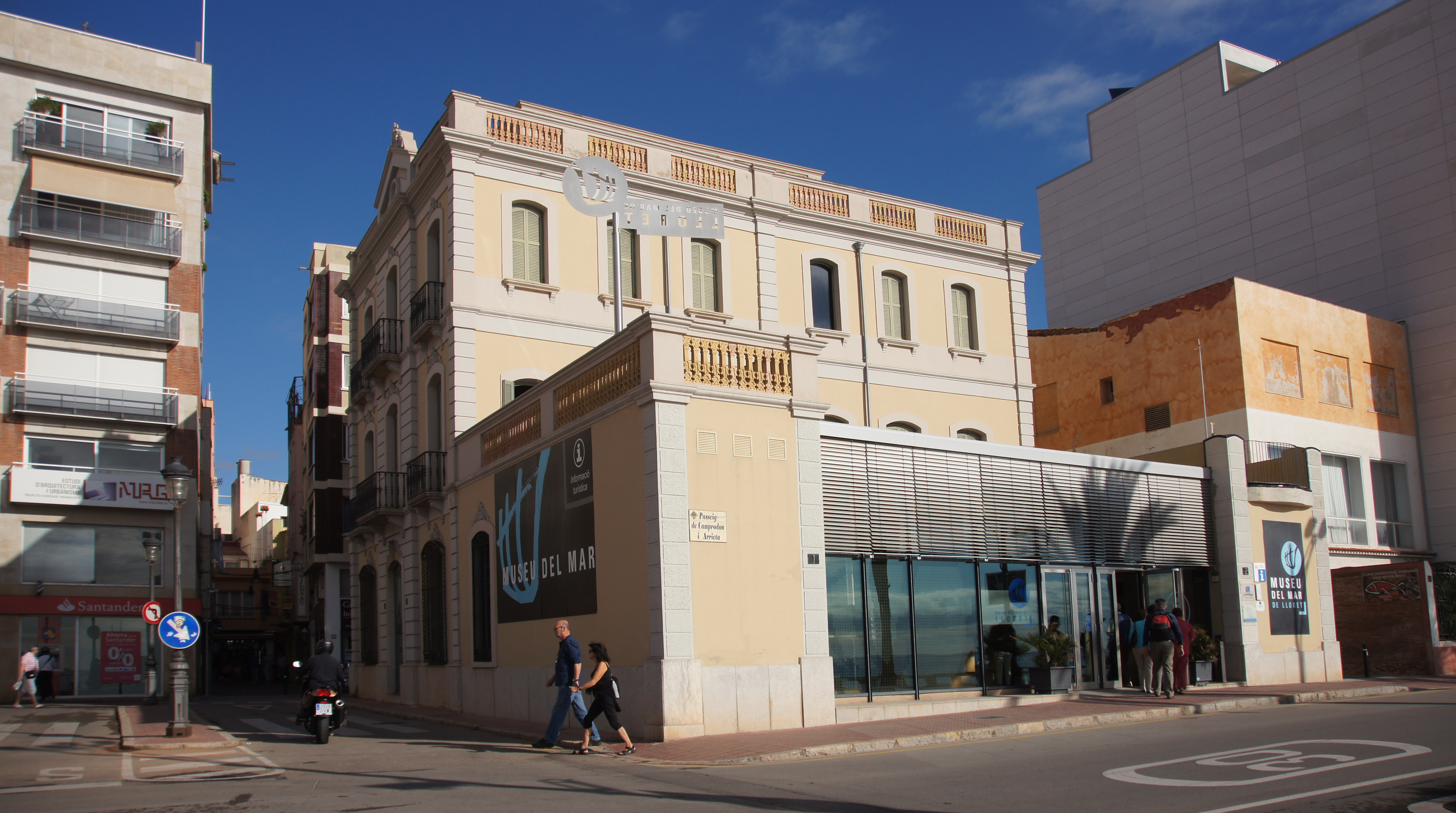
Maritime Museum, Lloret

The Maritime Museum, which focuses on the history of the Indianos and Lloret de Mar's seafaring and fishing past, is housed in Casa Garriga, an old Indiano house that was acquired by the town council in 1981 in order to turn it into a local museum. It is divided into five areas: Sons of the sea, Mediterranean, Gateway to the ocean, Lloret after sailing ships, and Beyond the beach. The route through the museum takes in everything from coastal trading in the Mediterranean to high-sea sailing across the Atlantic.

=== Castle of Sant Joan ===
Situated at the top of the hill that separates Lloret de Mar and Fenals beaches, it dates back to the turn of the 11th century. The castle served as a watchtower to warn of possible attacks from the sea. The origins of the Castle of Sant Joan are the origins of the town of Lloret. Back in the 11th century, the area of land delimited as Loredo was ruled over by Sicardis of Lloret (1031-1103). According to the terms of Sicardis' will, the feudal land was to be shared between two of her sons: Bernat Umbert, Bishop of Girona, and Bernat Gaufred, a secular lord who became Lord of Palafolls. This shared jurisdiction lasted until 1218, when Bishop Bernat Umbert died and his fief passed exclusively to the See of the Chapter of Girona Cathedral. In 1790, the Comú (Town Council) and the inhabitants of Lloret asked the Royal Council of the Treasury ("Real Consejo de Hacienda") to make the castle and its land royal property in exchange for the payment of 8,000 pounds to the Cathedral Chapter for its loss of ownership rights. The legal dispute, which lasted until 1802, was decided in favour of Lloret's inhabitants, bringing almost eight centuries of feudal rule to an end, although the Castle of Sant Joan belonged to the Chapter until 1807. The Third Coalition War that pitted Great Britain against Spain and France, and which concluded at the Battle of Trafalgar, had disastrous consequences for the tower of the Castle of Sant Joan. In 1805 the British Navy bombed the tower, destroying the fortified enclosure once and for all. The castle remained in disuse throughout the 19th century and was reduced to ruins. The restoration of the keep, which is now open to visitors, was completed in 1992. Meanwhile, the excavations and the museological project were completed between 2000 and 2001.

=== Modernist cemetery of the Indianos ===
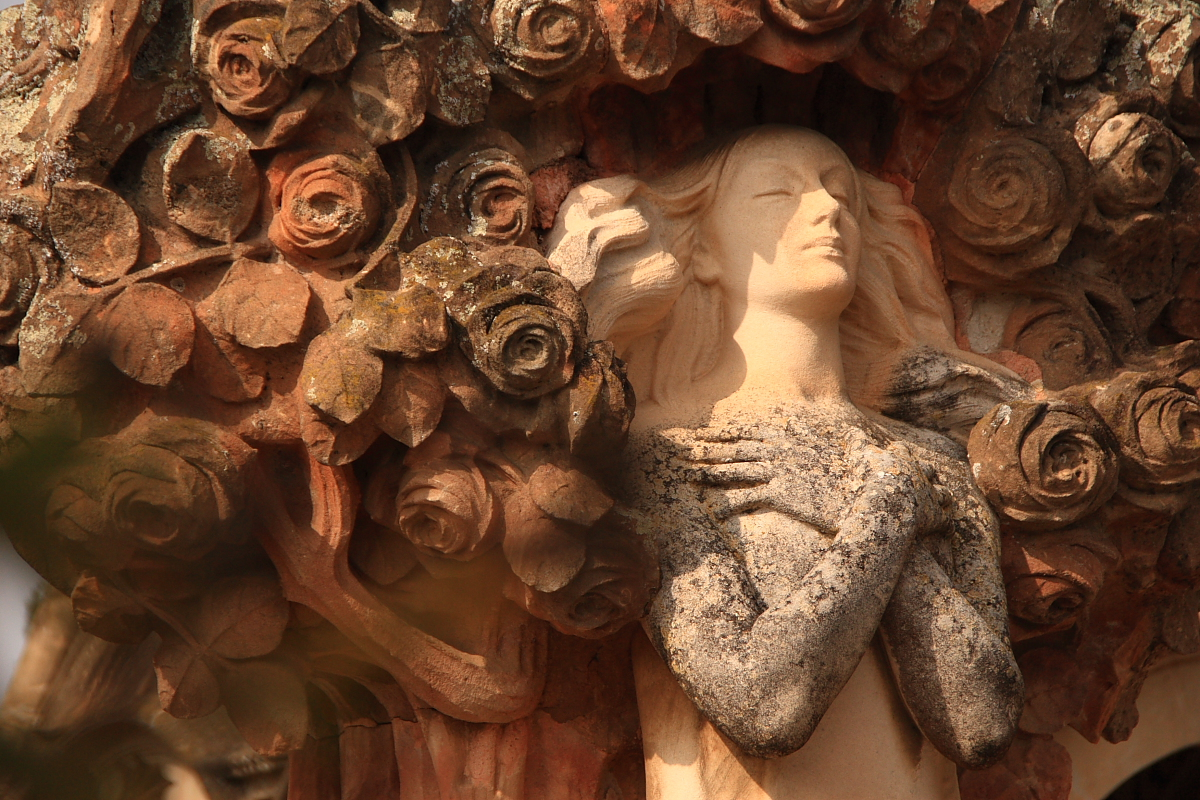
Marble figure designed by Ismael Smith i Marí at the modernist cemetery of the Indianos

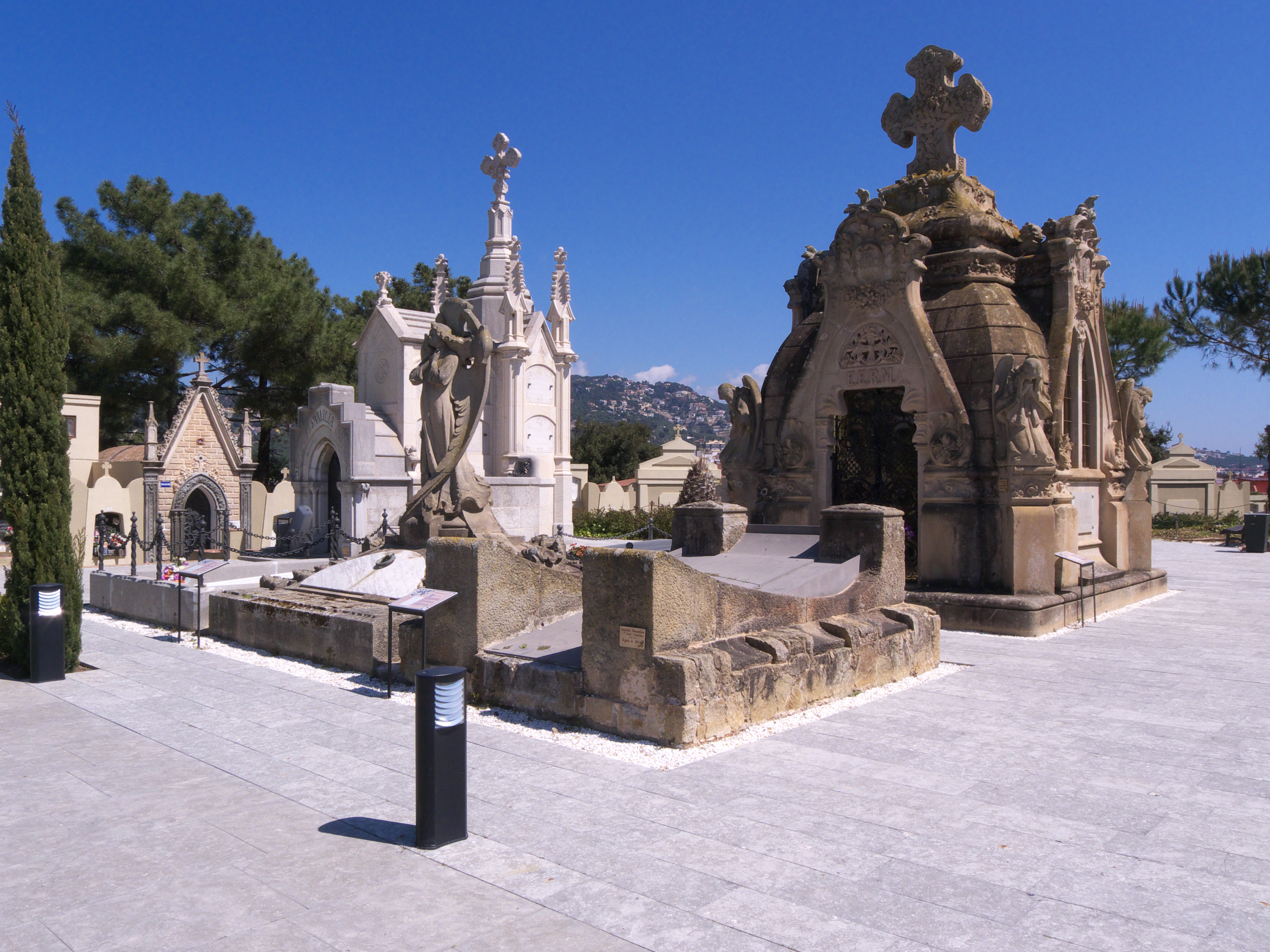
Lloret de Mar Cemetery

The modernist cemetery of Lloret de Mar is one of the most important Indiano cemeteries in Catalonia and one of the most representative anywhere in Spain. The essence of Lloret de Mar cemetery can be traced to the arrival of the newly rich Indianos, those who returned to the town after making their fortune in the Americas. Designed by Joaquim Artau i Fàbregas, the main avenue contains a series of dazzling pantheons and hypogea in a highly evocative modernist style.

Bonaventura Conill i Montobbio, a disciple of Gaudí, was one of the cemetery's most prolific architects, producing high crosses, dragons that watch over the darkness and death, and angels with heads bowed who mourn like any mortal.

The Indianos were families with many good connections, which explains the presence of works by architects such as Puig i Cadafalch and Ismael Smith i Marí, who designed the pale marble female figure that symbolises death and that rests surrounded by red roses. At the end of the central avenue there is a chapel around which the second category hypogea are arranged. There are rows of avenues lined with very similar and highly decorative pantheons, all joined, some adorned with fresh flowers and others left bare.

Work on the new cemetery began in 1896 and its construction was completed in 1901. Relatively unknown, it offers a wide perspective on the funerary art of the period. The completed basic structure of the cemetery was impressive for a town with fewer than 4000 inhabitants. Once it was officially opened the leading architects and sculptors of the time contributed works. Joaquim Artau i Fàbregas drew up the original plans and once the cemetery opened the architects Antoni Maria Gallissà and Josep Puig i Cadafalch were the first to execute projects for the new necropolis. Another architect, Vicenç Artigas i Albertí, soon became involved and over the course of 1903 Bonaventura Conill i Montobbio, a disciple of Gaudí, joined the group. Both of these architects continued to work for the cemetery on a regular basis and most of the works that make up the complex constituted an important part of their output. In 1905 Ramon Maria Riudor joined the list of contributors. This architect, who worked on and off in Lloret de Mar, designed a pantheon for the cemetery. The cemetery of Lloret de Mar is possibly one of the most important examples of Catalan funerary art of the modernist period. Although it is a rather small complex, it contains a good number of works capable of reviving the debate over modernist art and the modernists.

=== Modernist buildings ===
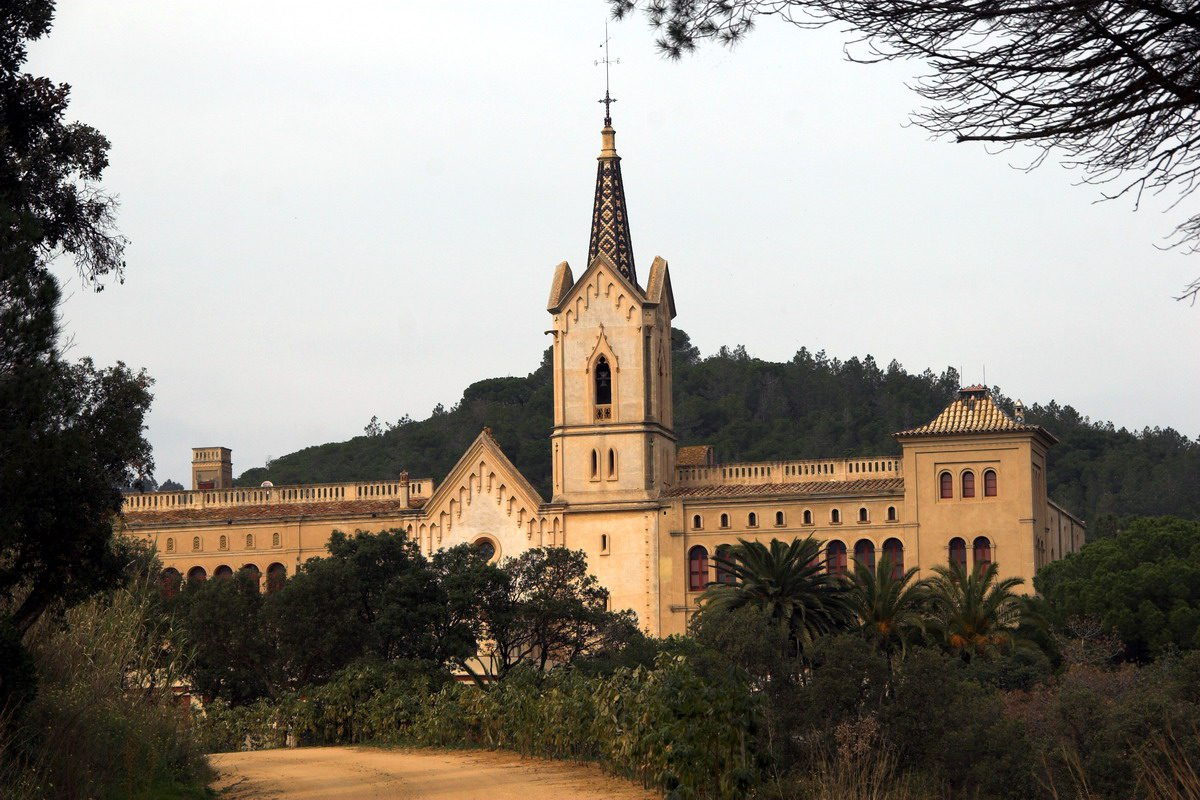
Sanctuary of Sant Pere del Bosc

Architects such as Enric Monserdà, Bonaventura Conill and Puig i Cadafalch built modernist buildings including the Sanctuary of Sant Pere del Bosc with the small chapel of Mare de Déu de Gràcia (Our Lady of Grace), or the chapel of the Baptistery and the chapel of the Santíssim Sagrament (Holiest Sacrament), both of which belong to the church of Sant Romà, and, last of all, the pantheon of the Costa Macià family, one of the most complex and sumptuous modernist structures in Lloret de Mar cemetery.

=== Puig de Castellet Iberian settlement ===
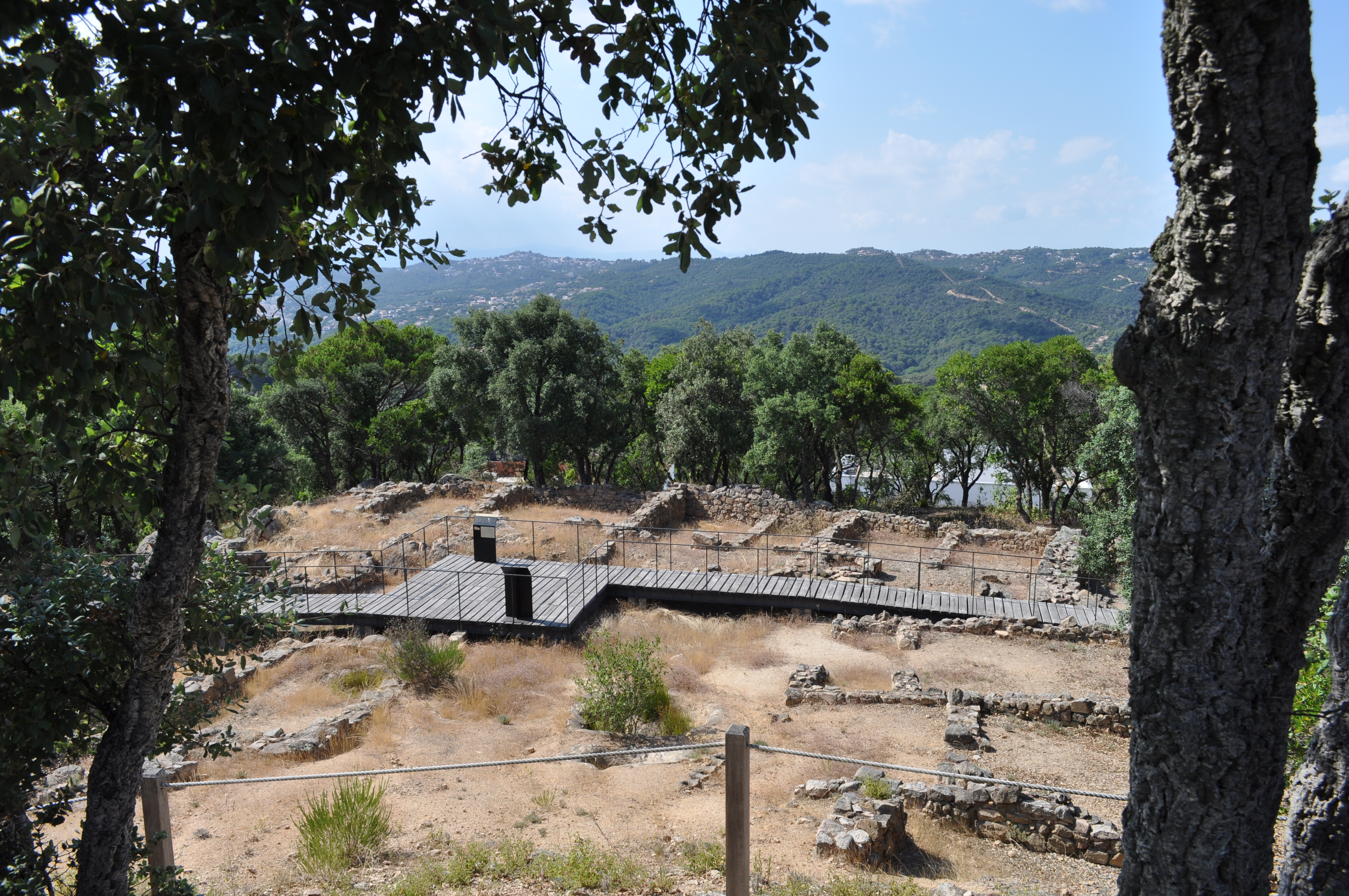
Puig de Castellet Iberian settlement

There are three Iberian settlements in Lloret de Mar: Montbarbat, Puig de Castellet and Turó Rodó, dating from as far back as the 4th century BC (Montbarbat) to as late as the 2nd century BC (Turó Rodó). By the time of the 1st century BC, the Iberian world had been swept away due to the expansion of the Roman Empire.

The Iberians, who were the indigenous inhabitants of the Iberian Peninsula, were organised into territorial tribes: Laietani, Cessetani, Ilercavones, Ilergetes, Ausetani and Indigetes. The Indigetes inhabited the Puig de Castellet settlement. This settlement, dating from the 3rd century BC, is situated two kilometres away from Lloret de Mar town centre in a strategic spot with an excellent vantage point overlooking the area stretching from the Tordera estuary to the Lloret coast. It is a small 650 m^{2} enclosure composed of around six dwellings. The settlement was fortified with a thick wall and defence towers during a turbulent period of history that shook the Mediterranean region from 264 BC to 146 BC: the Punic Wars. The strengthening of the enclosure wall dates back to the 3rd century BC, coinciding with the period of Carthaginian rule. As such, this settlement was active for around 50 years between 250 BC and 200 BC, at which point it was abandoned.

The excavations have been carried out in various stages: the first from 1968 to 1969, the second from 1970 to 1972 and the third and final stage from 1975 to 1986. During the excavations a large amount of archaeological material was unearthed, mostly locally produced ceramics but also Attic ceramics imported from different places, including Italy, Greece and Rhode (Roses). The Puig de Castellet settlement has been incorporated in the "Route of the Iberians", created by the Archaeology Museum of Catalonia and for which Lloret de Mar Town Council has carried out the necessary site adaptation.

=== Indiano houses route ===
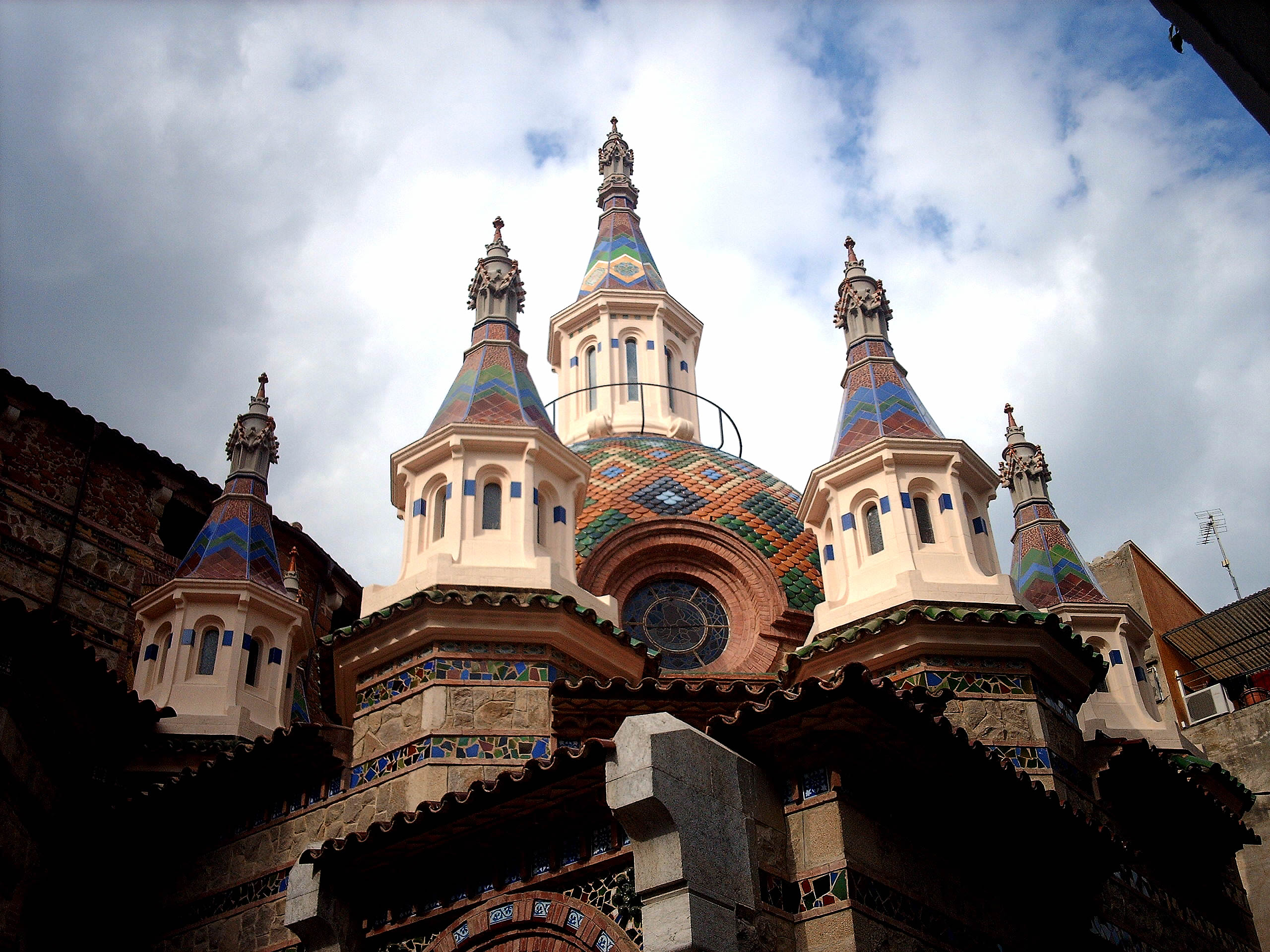
Church of Sant Romà

- Church of Sant Romà: In 2014 restoration work was completed on the Can Font building, the former residence of a family of Indianos, which was the name given to Catalans who emigrated to America at the turn of the 20th century to seek their fortune. Between 1800 and 1840 many of Lloret's townsfolk set sail for America, many of them children of the town's poorest families, with the dream of making their fortune in the New World. Two Cuban cities, Havana and Matanzas, were the most common destinations for emigrants, who took on all sorts of jobs there. However, they never lost touch with their home town, one of the Catalan towns that was most influenced by these connections with the Indies. The Indianos were philanthropists and benefactors who contributed to Lloret's urban transformation. They funded many charity projects, such as the hospital and schools, and took an active part in the modernist reconstruction of the parish church.
- Casa Garriga (Maritime Museum): Enric Garriga i Mataró, who emigrated to Cienfuegos (Cuba) and made his fortune with a construction materials firm, had this house built. When he died, his widow purchased the adjacent plot, creating a twin-structured building with a ground floor, two upper floors and a garden on the promenade side. The totally symmetrical façade features six balconies on the two upper floors, crowned by a pediment and balustrades. Casa Garriga now houses the Maritime Museum, dedicated to showcasing the town's seafaring past.
- Passeig Verdaguer or Passeig de les Palmeres: Promenade with a colonial feel built by the Girona-based architect Martí Sureda on land reclaimed from the sea. Flanked by the Casa Garriga building at one end and by the grand town hall at the other, Passeig de les Palmeres, which would later bear the name of Jacint Verdaguer, was a project promoted by the Indianos, who had their residences built on plots in this reclaimed area. Their largesse enabled the town council to raise the funds for building the new neoclassical town hall.
- Carrer de les Vídues i Donzelles: A narrow street with a curious name (Widows and Maidens) that recalls a theme associated with the Indiano legend: young maidens who became wealthy widows when their Indiano husbands died were discouraged from seeking a new husband by a special clause in the dead husband's will, by virtue of which they would lose their fortune on remarrying. As such, they tended to stay at home and seldom went out.
- Parish Church and Church of Sant Romà: The Indianos funded the modernist reconstruction of the church (1914), a project commissioned to the architect Bonaventura Conill i Montobbio, with sculptures by Josep Llimona and Enric Clarasó. Two years later, from his home in Havana, Narcís Gelats provided the funds for the chapel of Santíssim Sacrament (Holiest Sacrament) (1916) in memory of his wife. Meanwhile, the link to the Americas is present in the mural of Our Lady of Charity (also known as Our Lady of El Cobre, patron saint of Cuba), which until recently was on display in the courtyard of the parish house and is currently being restored.
- House of Nicolau Font i Maig: Built in 1877 by Feliu Torras i Mataró of Lloret, the house of this Indiano was composed of a basement, ground floor, two upper floors, an attic and a courtyard. Of particular note is the modernist wooden door with a wrought iron gate featuring whiplash motifs and a set of symbolic Indiano figures wearing a feather plume on their heads.

=== Es Tint ===
Es Tint is a small property where Lloret's fishermen went until the 1960s to dye their nets, using a liquid produced by boiling water and pine bark. This was when nets were made of hemp, esparto and, later on, cotton. The nets were dyed by means of an ancient technique used throughout the Mediterranean, which consisted of soaking the nets in the liquid previously boiled in the cauldron until they were well impregnated. They were then wrung and put out to dry on the beach. The dye served both to increase the durability of the nets and to camouflage them in the sea.

The emergence of nylon nets signalled the end of this small industry, which depended on the Fishermen's Guild, and the building fell into disuse.

In the past, every coastal town had premises of this kind for dyeing nets, normally run by the local guild. Not many survive today; on the Costa Brava only the Sa Perola building in Calella de Palafrugell and Es Tint in Lloret de Mar remain.

== Hiking ==
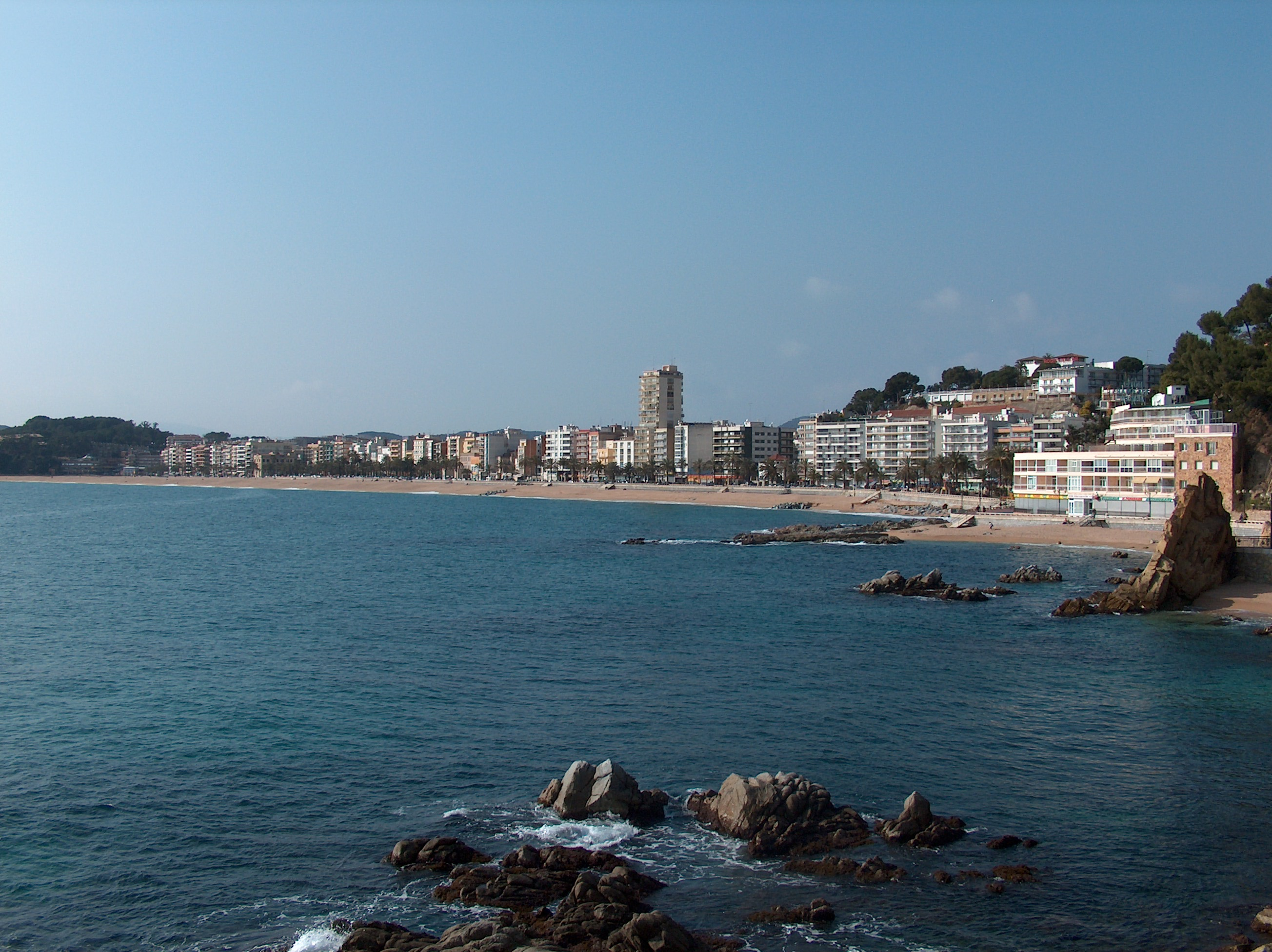
End of the coastal footpath at Lloret beach

=== Long-distance or GR (gran recorrido) footpaths ===
Two sections of the GR92 Mediterranean footpath pass through Lloret:

- stage 11, taking in Tossa de Mar, Platja de Canyelles and Lloret de Mar, covering 14.5 km (9.0 mi) and with an approximate duration of 3 hours and 15 minutes;
- and stage 12, taking in Lloret de Mar, the Castell de Sant Joan de Blanes, Blanes and Tordera, covering 17.2 km (10.69 mi) and with an approximate duration of 3 hours and 40 minutes.

=== Coastal footpaths ===
The Lloret de Mar - Fenals coastal footpath is a trail which hugs the Lloret coastline from Lloret beach to Fenals beach. It begins at the end of the Lloret's seafront promenade, passing by the Es Racó de Garbí spot and the little cove of Sa Caravera. Some steps then lead up to a path that winds its way around a rocky coastline. It then passes by the Es salt des Burros spot before leading on to the Dona Marinera (Seafarer's Wife) statue by the sculptor Ernest Maragall i Noble. Another set of steps then lead down to Cala Banys, a rocky cove with several reefs. The footpath crosses a pine grove, emerging at Fenals point, where the mediaeval Castle of Sant Joan is located. Following the path from the watchtower, some steps lead down to Plaça Sisquella, located at the start of the Fenals seafront promenade.

== Events ==
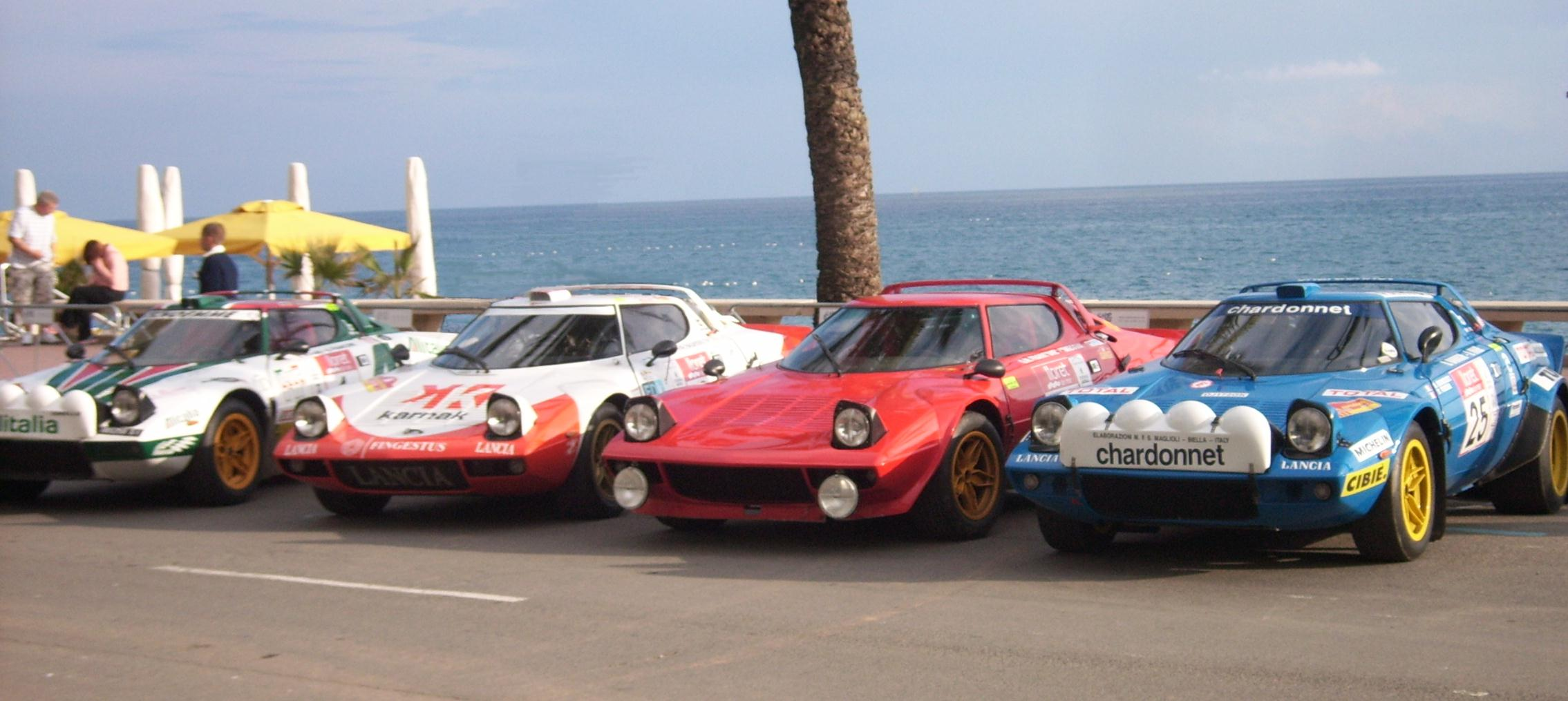
Lancia Stratos in the Rally Costa Brava of Lloret de Mar, November 2008 (Rally Catalunya, WRC)

=== Carnestoltes (Carnival King) ===
Since February 2012, Lloret de Mar has been promoting its annual carnival in conjunction with Blanes and Tossa de Mar under the Costa Brava South Carnival brand, an initiative aimed at encouraging visitors to enjoy and take part in the parades of the three towns. In Lloret the main event is the Great Parade of the Carnestoltes (Carnival King).

=== Rally Costa Brava ===
The Rally Costa Brava is the oldest event of its kind in Spain and since it was first held in 1953 Lloret de Mar has always been at the epicentre of the competition. In 1988 the two most important rallies in Catalonia, the Rally Costa Brava and the Rally Catalunya, were merged to form the Rally Catalunya – Costa Brava, taking as a reference the 24 Rally Catalunya competitions held rather than the 35 previous Rally Costa Brava competitions. In parallel, the 10 x Hora motor sports association continued to organise its own rally, initially the Costa Brava – Lloret Rally (1988), and then the Rally Lloret – Costa Brava (1989–1994). In 1991, the Rally Catalunya – Costa Brava became a point-scoring world championship event, a situation that lasted until 2004. The Lloret de Mar Town Council immediately set about ensuring that this important association with motor sports was not lost, and since then has hosted the Rally Costa Brava and the Rally Costa Brava Històric every year. Both rallies, very well attended by participants and spectators alike, recover the essence of the original Rally Costa Brava competitions, offering spectators the chance to see legendary drivers and co-drivers up close.

=== Mediterranean International Cup ===
The Mediterranean International Cup, held in April, is an international youth football tournament for promising young players. It is held in various locations in the province of Girona, although Lloret de Mar is the epicentre of the event and is where all the participants stay. Some of the world's leading clubs take part in this international tournament, including Barcelona, Real Madrid or Valencia, among others. Lionel Messi, Neymar, Jordi Alba and Gerard Piqué of Barcelona; Juan Mata of Manchester United; Cesc Fàbregas of Chelsea); Lucas of Liverpool; and Marcelo of Real Madrid are just some of the players who have taken part in the MIC and who now play for the world's leading clubs, which makes this a key event for scouts.

=== Lloret Formula Weekend ===
Lloret de Mar is important accommodation base for Formula 1 enthusiasts who travel to Catalonia to see the F1 Grand Prix at the Circuit de Barcelona-Catalunya. In 2012, the destination created a special themed event to tie in with the F1 Grand Prix: the Lloret Formula Weekend, a weekend in May packed with activities. Visitors can experience what it is like to drive a Ferrari, take part in a F1 simulator competition and see a parade of authentic single-seater race cars through the streets of Lloret. There is also a car show with official products of top makes on sale, live music in the streets and nightlife in Lloret's discothèques and in the Gran Casino Costa Brava.

=== Lloret Night Shopping ===
Lloret Night Shopping is a shopping, fashion and eating-out event held in May and September, in which shops remain open until the small hours. The event also includes live music, fashion parades, performances and options for eating out.

=== Rice Gastronomy Days ===
This event takes place in May and the main ingredient is rice, which is combined with local products from the sea or mountains, with a variety of culinary offerings ranging from the most traditional to the most innovative.

=== Americanos Fair ===
Lloret de Mar has an important seafaring past, especially at the turn of the 20th century. Those who emigrated from Lloret to America to seek their fortune were known in the town as Americanos and as Indianos in the rest of Catalonia. For one weekend in June the town travels back to this Indiano period and the streets are filled with all sorts of activities, such as street theatre, demonstrations of traditional trades, craft markets and guided tours, among others.

=== Beaches Fun Walk ===
The now-traditional Beaches Fun Walk takes place on the last Sunday in September and is organised by the Xino-Xano cultural association. Participants in the 11 km (7 mi) fun walk gather at the meeting point in Plaça de la Vila first thing in the morning and then travel by cruise boat or coach to Cala Canyelles, where the walk begins. This is mostly a coastal route, winding its way along a coastal footpath that offers views from the cliffs as it passes by Cala Trons, Sa Caleta, Lloret's main beach, Fenals beach and Sa Boadella, ending up at Santa Cristina beach.

=== Cuina del Peix de l'Art Gastronomy Days ===
These fish and seafood gastronomy days recall Lloret de Mar's seafaring past and its close association with the sea. The name refers to the ancient fishing technique known as tirada a l'art that was carried out on the beach of Cala Canyelles in Lloret. 25 restaurants and hotels from the town take part in this October event.

=== Rally Costa Brava Històric ===
In addition to the Rally Costa Brava, since 2003 Lloret de Mar has been hosting the Rally Costa Brava Històric, which has become one of the world's leading vintage car rallies. This competition recovers the essence of great competitions, offering spectators the chance to see legendary drivers and co-drivers up close. Meanwhile, with the idea of also hosting a speed rally for vintage cars, in 2005 the Rally Costa Brava was revived, which in essence is a continuation of the oldest rally in Spain. This rally is a point-scoring event in various national and international categories and is viewed by the FIA (Fédération Internationale de l'Automobile) as one of the most prestigious on the continent.

=== Medieval Fair ===
The Medieval Fair is held as part of the festivities of Sant Romà, patron saint of Lloret de Mar. The town travels back to the Middle Ages with themed stalls and a wide variety of activities: troubadours, music, magic shows, the caravan of donkeys, medieval huts, workshops, an exhibition of medieval torture implements, calligraphy, demonstrations of artisan trades, games and a play centre for children. Held in November.

=== Tirada a l’Art ===
Tirada a l’art is perhaps one of the most deeply rooted traditions in the town of Lloret de Mar. This activity is held on Lloret's main beach in February and December and is a way of remembering and paying tribute to the fishing technique through which many of the town's inhabitants earned a living many years ago. It consists of casting the net into the water at daybreak and then hauling it back to the shore and onto the beach, gathering up all the fish that it has dragged in.

== Demography ==
The origin of the non-EU immigrants, unlike neighbouring municipalities, broadly tends to be North African or Latin American (employee employed in construction or services) and Asian (self employed: trade).

The increase in population began to be noticed in the 1990s but it was with the entry of the 21st century when the demographics of the town began to grow uncontrollably due mainly to the influx of non-EU immigrants. Currently they constitute 40% of the total population.

1900	1930	1950	1970	1986	2009
3,242	3,012	3,159	7,064	14,567	39,363

== Economy ==
=== Tourism ===
In 1987, 27% of the total tourism establishment offering of the Costa Brava was concentrated in Lloret de Mar, but with 49% of the total hotel beds offering:

Comparison between Lloret de Mar and the Costa Brava 1956-1986
Lloret de Mar	1956	1960	1968	1972	1976	1979	1983	1986	2013
Establishments in Lloret de Mar	34	73	191	210	198	174	171	171	117
Establishments on the Costa Brava	181	332	721	756	717	680	610	624	464
Hotel beds	1956	1960	1968	1972	1976	1979	1983	1986	2013
Hotel beds in Lloret de Mar	1.336	3.532	12.331	25.099	29.331	28.299	25.690	30.926	30.000
Hotel beds on the Costa Brava	6.543	14.407	42.007	59.868	64.105	61.701	60.251	62.979	64.767
Lloret de Mar / Costa Brava	1956	1960	1968	1972	1976	1979	1983	1986	2013
% establishments in respect of the Costa Brava	18,78%	21,99%	26,49%	27,78%	27,62%	25,59%	28,03%	27,40%	25,21%
% hotel beds in respect of the Costa Brava	20,42%	24,52%	29,35%	41,92%	45,75%	45,86%	42,64%	49,11%	46,31%

Every year, Lloret welcomes 12% of the tourists who visit Catalonia and over 40% of the tourists who visit the Costa Brava. Lloret de Mar is ranked the fifth largest sun and sand destination in Spain and the largest in Catalonia in terms of the number of hotel beds. 50% of its hotel accommodation offering is concentrated in hotels with three stars or more and, while 64% of the five-star and luxury hotel accommodation on the Costa Brava is located in the town. Lloret de Mar's hotel offering in 2013 consisted of 30,000 hotel beds and over 120 establishments, of which 13,000 beds were in three-star hotels and 11,000 in four and five-star hotels.

=== General tourism data ===
Lloret de Mar boasts over 120 hotel establishments with approximately 30,000 hotel beds. The average stay is 5 days and the average occupancy rate is 60%

Visitors 2013	Jan	Feb	Mar	Apr	May	Jun	Jul	Aug	Sep	Oct	Nov	Dec	TOTAL
National	-	14.662	30.033	16.410	26.853	25.893	15.800	27.470	22.799	18.090	17.410	-	215.440
International	-	8.018	33.550	69.916	87.923	114.915	141.960	151.959	110.755	64.673	18.097	-	801.766
	-	22.700	63.583	86.326	114.776	140.808	157.760	179.429	133.554	82.763	35.507	-	1.017.206
Overnight stays 2013	Jan	Feb	Mar	Apr	May	Jun	Jul	Aug	Sep	Oct	Nov	Dec	TOTAL
National	-	39.868	119.652	89.287	97.775	47.310	43.649	90.885	55.626	51.218	44.029	-	679.299
International	-	31.207	121.651	275.090	409.867	600.258	900.216	925.347	637.140	341.394	68.367	-	4.310.537
	-	71.075	241.303	364.377	507.642	647.568	943.865	1.016.232	692.766	392.612	112.396	-	4.989.836
Average stay 2013	Jan	Feb	Mar	Apr	May	Jun	Jul	Aug	Sep	Oct	Nov	Dec	TOTAL
Days	-	3,13	3,8	4,22	4,42	4,6	5,98	5,66	5,19	4,74	3,17	-	

Comparison of visitor numbers 2012-2013
Lloret de Mar	Jan	Feb	Mar	Apr	May	Jun	Jul	Aug	Sep	Oct	Nov	Dec	TOTAL
2012	-	27.862	51.194	99.872	99.600	123.004	150.330	158.863	135.200	73.778	37.698	17.844	975.245
2013	-	22.700	63.583	86.326	114.776	140.808	157.760	179.429	133.554	82.762	35.507	0	1.017.206

=== Tourism seals ===
The sports tourism destination (Destinació de Turisme Esportiu - DTE) certificate is a specialist seal awarded by the Catalan Tourism Agency (Agència Catalana de Turisme - ACT) with the goal of promoting tourism destinations equipped for various kinds of sports and which stand out for their offering of high quality resources and services for elite, professional and amateur sports people, along with tourists keen on sports activities. Lloret de Mar has been certified as a Sports Destination since 2006 thanks to a high quality and multidisciplinary sports offering concentrated in a single sports area in the town centre, surrounded by the hotel and shopping area and just 800 metres from the beach.

In 2010 the destination received the Family Tourism Destination seal of the Government of Catalonia.

=== 21st century tourism model ===
Lloret de Mar has redefined itself in recent years as an urban beach tourist destination. "Urban beach" is a new coastal destination concept in which the natural attractions of sun and sand are complemented by a series of added values related to the area, such as its history, inhabitants, traditions, customs, cultural heritage and a wide-ranging offering in terms of leisure, tourism and services.

Lloret de Mar drew up its first Strategic Tourism Plan in 2010, a plan that brought together a decade of work focused on joint initiatives between the public authorities and the private sector, which began in 2003 with the creation of the Lloret Turisme tourism promotion body. The plan is currently at the implementation stage with two key objectives: on the one hand, to opt for one of the Tourist Destination Reconversion Plans promoted by the Spanish government in partnership with the Government of Catalonia, designed to achieve the reconversion and comprehensive modernisation of mature destinations of international standing and potential; and, on the other hand, to consolidate its strategic products (urban beach, sports tourism and business tourism) as a strategy for reducing the seasonal nature of tourism. The first objective was achieved in March 2014 with the signing of the Pilot Plan Agreement for Lloret with the Government of Catalonia.

== Shopping ==
The markedly seasonal nature of tourism is a key feature of the town's shopping infrastructure. In 1983 there were 306 permanent retail outlets and 272 seasonal retail outlets. Lloret has the second highest number of retail outlets on the Costa Brava, ranked only below Figueres, a non-coastal town.

Lloret de Mar currently boasts (2014) 1000 retail outlets, of which 500 are concentrated in the town's old quarter. Moreover, since 2010 the shops in Lloret de Mar have been authorised to open every day of the year, including public holidays. Commercial fairs and activities are held throughout the year, such as the Lloret Night Shopping event, the Botiga al career festival (where local shops sell their wares in outdoor stalls) or the Mediaeval Fair, among others. The weekly street market held every Tuesday and the daily Municipal Market are also recommended.

== Transport and communication ==
=== Roads ===
Lloret de Mar can be reached along two coastal roads (passing through Tossa de Mar from the north and through Blanes from the south) and one inland road (passing through Vidreres). There is very heavy traffic on all three roads, especially in the summer. The inland road is the main connection to the rest of Spain and abroad, since it links up with the National II road, to the AP-7 motorway and to Girona-Costa Brava airport. Meanwhile, the coastal roads constitute the main routes to Barcelona (80 km (50 mi) away) and to the French border (approximately 100 km (62 mi) away). From the south, the C-32 coastal motorway connects Barcelona to Lloret (exit 134) as far as Blanes; the final 12 km (7 mi) are along the GI-600 road heading to Blanes and the GI-682 road heading to Lloret de Mar. Coming from the north (France) on the AP-7 motorway, exit 9 (Lloret de Mar) must be taken. The final 14 km (9 mi) are along the C-63 road. Coming from the north-east, there are 12 km (7 mi) from Tossa to Lloret along the GI-682 road.

=== Scheduled coach network ===
Lloret de Mar offers scheduled and chartered coach services to Barcelona, Girona and major European cities, with vehicles adapted for persons of reduced mobility. Lloret has an international bus station and private stations that cater for international coaches.

=== Urban network ===
The urban bus network connects all the town's districts and tourism areas.

=== Taxis ===
There are four taxi ranks in Lloret with over 40 taxis that operate around the clock, all year round. Four-seater and seven-seater vehicles are available, along with vehicles for persons of reduced mobility. Taxis are white and display a taxi sign.

=== Trains ===
There is no direct train service in Lloret de Mar; the nearest railway station is in Blanes, which since March 2014 connects southwards to Barcelona and northwards as far as Portbou on the commuter network. The Pujol bus company runs a shuttle service from Lloret bus station to Blanes railway station every 30 minutes. Trains heading to Barcelona leave every 30 minutes and the journey takes 80 minutes.

=== Canyelles Marina ===
Canyelles marina is the only marina in Lloret de Mar. It is located at Canyelles beach and is suitable for medium-sized vessels.

=== Boat trips ===
Lloret de Mar offers tourism cruise services that connect to the neighbouring towns of Blanes, Tossa de Mar and Sant Feliu de Guíxols during the summer season.

=== Airports ===
The closest airports are Barcelona airport 75 km (47 mi) away, and Girona airport 30 km (19 mi). Barcelona airport offers scheduled flights to the world's major cities. Thanks to the low-cost airlines that operate in Girona airport, Lloret de Mar is connected to a large number of European cities. The airport also enjoys a high volume of charter flight traffic. Finally, Perpignan airport is 90 minutes away by car.

== Notable people ==
- William L. Shirer and his wife Tess lived in Lloret de Mar for almost a year in 1933-1934. He describes the town in the opening pages of his Berlin Diary (1941) and also in the first volume of his autobiography.
- Marc Muniesa (1992), footballer
- Richard Shannon (1979), advertising and tourism executive

== Sport ==
The city has a roller hockey team CH Lloret, one of the most important in Catalonia, and dispute the main League OK Liga.

== Bibliography ==
- Panareda Clopés, Rios Calvet, Rabella Vives, Josep Maria, Jaume i Josep Maria (1989). Guia de Catalunya. Barcelona: Caixa de Catalunya. ISBN 84-87135-02-1.
- Daban i Massana, Joaquim (2003). "Els pobles de la Selva: Lloret de Mar". Servei d'Arxiu Municipal de Lloret de Mar (Breu història de Lloret de Mar).
- Frigola i Triola, Llinàs i Pol, Montalban i Martínez, Josep, Joan i Carme (2009). Turó Rodó: un assentament ibèric tardà a Lloret de Mar. Lloret de Mar: Council of Lloret de Mar. ISBN 978-84-933602-8-3.
- Llinàs i Pol, Mallorquí i Garcia, Merino i Serra, Montalbán i Martínez, Joan, Elvis, Jordi i Carme (2003). El castell de Sant Joan de Lloret. Lloret de Mar: Council of Lloret de Mar. ISBN 84-921596-9-3.
- Vilà i Galí, Agustí M. (2011). L'església parroquial de Sant Romà de Lloret de Mar 1509-2009. Lloret de Mar: Council of Lloret de Mar. ISBN 978-84-937592-7-8.
- Cabañas, Cristina (2012). Petita història de Lloret de Mar. Editorial Mediterrània S.L. ISBN 978-84-9979-125-8.
- "Diagnosi territorial de la comarca de la Selva. Entorn físic" (PDF). Agenda21 Comarcal. Archived from the original (PDF) on 2014-05-25.
