= Emilio Heydrich =

German-Cuban merchant, entrepreneur and landowner

Emilio Heydrich Martinez
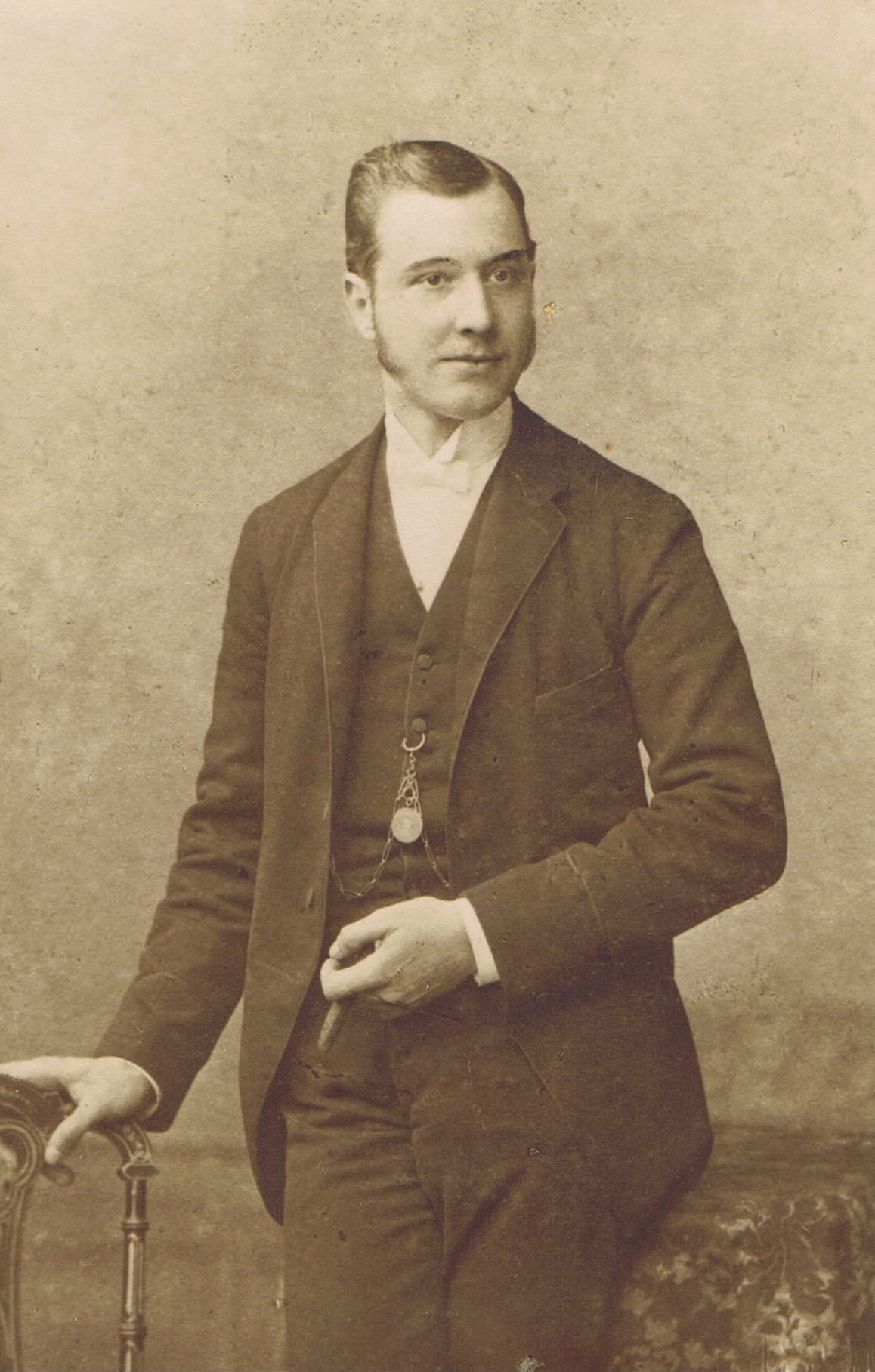
- Born: 1861; Matanzas, Captaincy General of Cuba, Spanish Empire
- Died: 1947 (aged 85–86); Lloret de Mar, Spain
- Burial place: Cementiri de Lloret de Mar
- Occupation: Entrepreneur
- Known for: President of Hispania SA
- Father: Fernando Heydrich

Emilio Heydrich Martínez (Cuba 1861 – Barcelona 1947), was a German-Cuban merchant, entrepreneur and landowner, son of Fernando Heydrich Klein and María-Candelaria Martínez y Valdés. Heydrich was married to Antonia Cubero y Casals and their daughter Aida Heydrich was married to the President of the Manufacturers of Cigars and Cigarettes of Cuba, Theodore Garbade.

== Industry ==
In 1923, he founded the company Colores Hispania S.A. for the supplies of painting products. 1927 he began to produce his own chemical products and supplies and, for which he created his new factory halls in Poblenou in Barcelona.

Like most of the factories in Barcelona, his company was confiscated by his workers during the Spanish Civil War, nevertheless he forgave the workers after the war, and continued the company with the same employees until his death in 1947. The company existed until 2000. The factory area with the historical facades was purchased in 1960 by the textile company Miro, and is under historic protection by the Catalan Government.

== Historical buildings ==
His factory of Colores Hispania SA in Calle Pere lV, number 482, in Poblenou, Barcelona, is a perfect example of industrial architecture of the early 20th century. Architect Josep Graner succeeded in giving the facade a particularly worthy character. It still exists today and is declared a historical place of interest.

Emilio Heydrich y Martínez lived in Calle Iradier, in the district Sarrià-Sant Gervasi, Barcelona. His is one of the first buildings of the architect Joaquim Lloret i Homs, who built several palaces in this district, but was mainly known for the rationalistic building of the Barraquer Ophthalmology Center in Barcelona (1934–1939). Heydrich's house, La Torre de San Fernando, is one of the important classicist palaces in the neighborhood of Sarria-Gervasi. Since 1960 it hosts the District Police Station, the Comisaria de los Mossos de Escuadra, after being sold by its last owners, his grandchilds Bernhard R. and Robert D. Garbade.

In Lloret de Mar, he built the Casa Aida in 1921. As many Spanish Cubans who returned to Spain he built his house in the style of Los Indianos.The architect Jose Gallart created a cube-shaped single-family house, which until 2006 remained the property of the family. His last owner was Heydrich's great-grandson, the artist Daniel Garbade.

Emilio Heydrich died in Lloret de mar, 1947. he is buried there in the modernistic cemetery, the Cementerio de Lloret de Mar.

== Literature ==
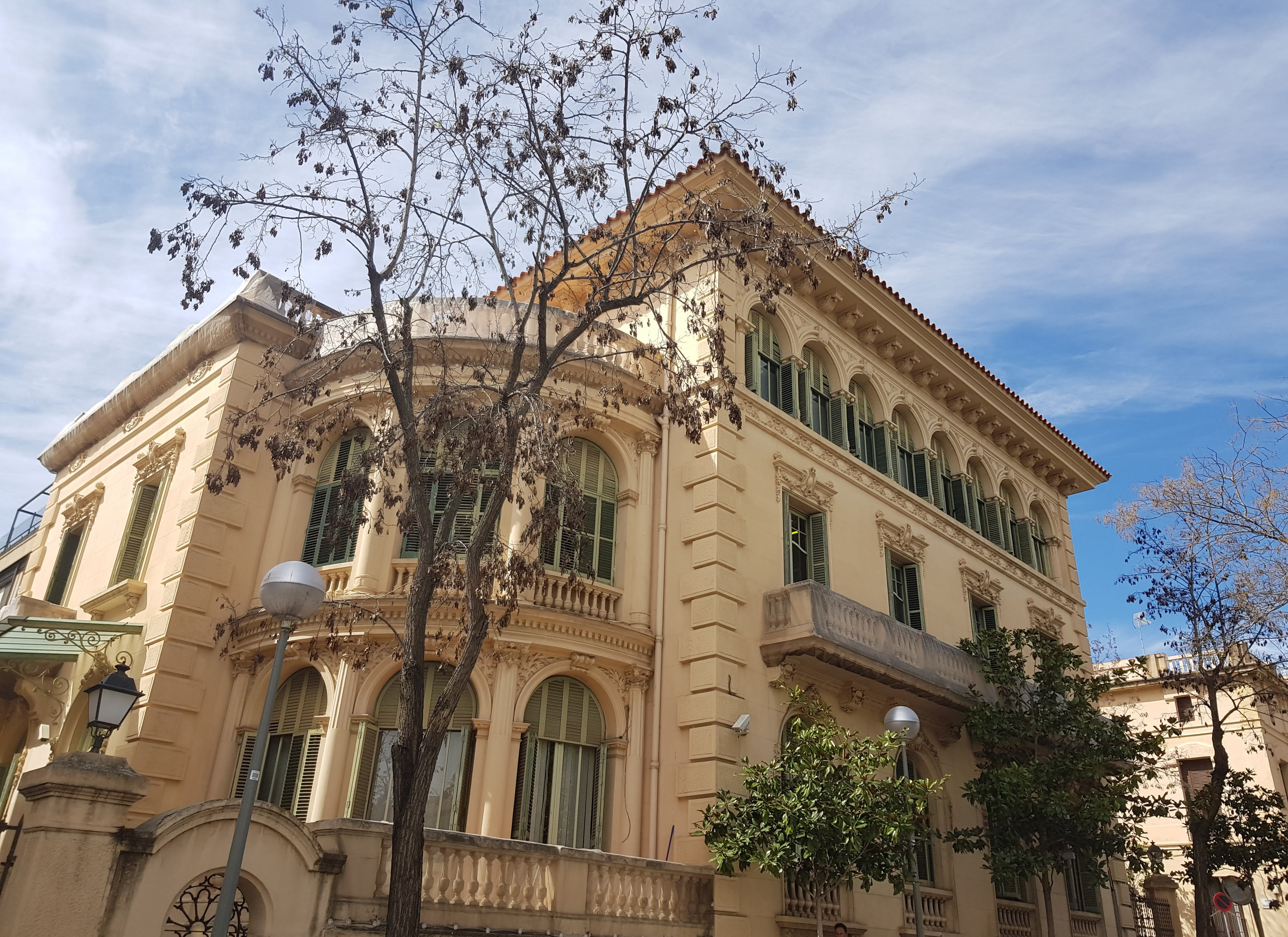
Mansion: Torre San Fernando by Joaquim Lloret i Homs

- William Jared Clark: Commercial Cuba: a book for business men, Editor: C. Scribner's Sons, 1898
- Elihu Root: Elihu Root collection of United States documents, Editor, Govt. Prtg. Off. EEUU
- Revista, Sociedad Astronómica de España y América, Volúmenes 1–4, 1911
- Receipts and Expenditures in Cuba from Jan. 1, 1899, to Apr. 30, 1900, United States. Congress. Senate. Committee on Relations with Cuba, 1900
- Guía social de La Habana, 1954
- Antonio Santamaría García :Economía y colonia: la economía cubana y la relación con España (1765–1902) CSICI, 2004
