= Sant Andreu de Llavaneres =

- Municipality
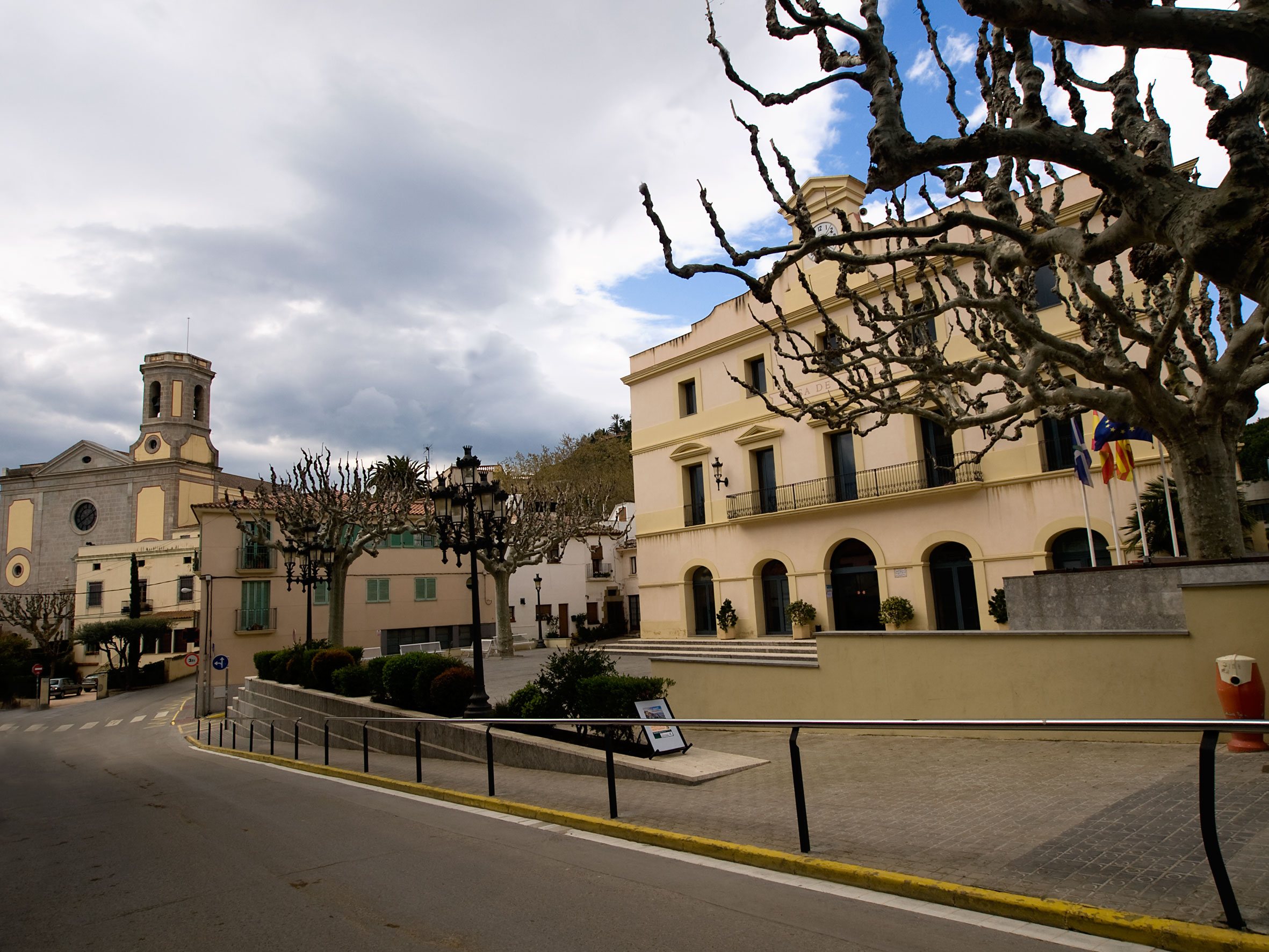
- Town hall and church

- Flag Coat of arms

- Location in Catalonia Sant Andreu de Llavaneres (Spain)
- Coordinates: 41°34′24″N 2°28′58″E
- Country: Spain
- Community: Catalonia
- Province: Barcelona
- Comarca: Maresme

Government
  - Mayor: Joan Mora Buch (2015)

Area
  - Total: 11.8 km^{2} (4.6 sq mi)
- Elevation: 125 m (410 ft)

Population (2025-01-01)
  - Total: 11,938
  - Density: 1,010/km^{2} (2,620/sq mi)
- Demonym(s): Llavanerenc, llavanerenca
- Website: santandreudellavaneres.cat

Sant Andreu de Llavaneres (Catalan pronunciation: [ˌsant ənˈdɾew ðə ʎəβəˈneɾəs]) is a municipality located 36 km north of Barcelona (Catalonia) (Spain), along the Mediterranean coast, between Mataró and Sant Vicenç de Montalt. It belongs to the Maresme comarca and the Barcelona province. The short name is simply Llavaneres.

Llavaneres faces the sea to the east and a natural park to the west. The village has a mixed agricultural and residential character and has become a popular vacation and summer-residence location for people living in Barcelona over the last forty years.

Good connections with Barcelona, the Maresme coast and the Mediterranean axis of France and Spain include a train line to Barcelona, as well as the C-32 highway and the N-2 road.

Sant Andreu de Llavaneres is today well known for its upscale sailing in summer.

== History ==
The oldest archaeological remains are from the Neolithic, especially the rocks of "Sant Magí" in the mountains of Montalt. Between the rivers Llavaneres and les Bruixes, the village Can Sanç dates from Roman times, where vineyards and olive trees were cultivated. The economic activity, as in Mataro and other communities, was purely agricultural. Later called Sant Andreu de Llavaneres, it was part of Mataro and gained independence in the mid-sixteenth century. Sant Andreu de Llavaneres became the resort of the better society of Barcelona (1920). Several of his modernist buildings, built by architects like Joaquim Lloret i Homs, date from this period.

== Demography ==
| 1900 | 1930 | 1950 | 1970 | 1986 | 2007 |
|---|---|---|---|---|---|
| 1129 | 1508 | 1758 | 2573 | 3432 | 9745 |
