= Joaquim Lloret i Homs =

Spanish architect

Joaquim Lloret i Homs (1890 – 1988) was a Spanish architect and builder whose most important work was the Barraquer Ophthalmology Center in Barcelona.

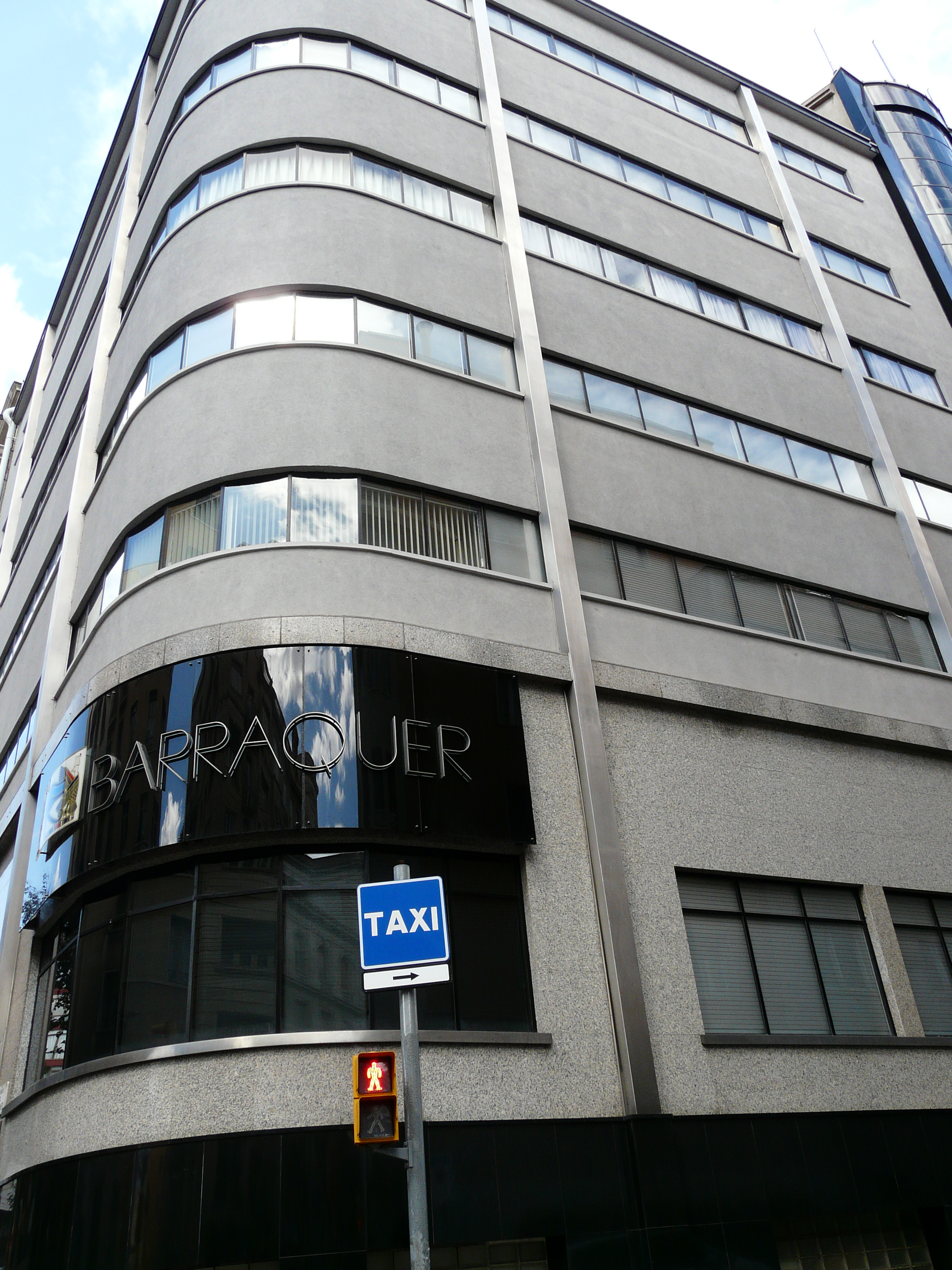
Barranquer Ophthalmology Center

== Works ==
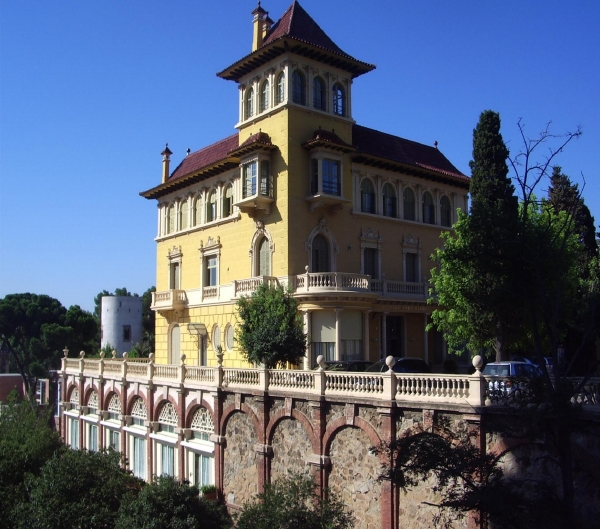
Casa San Isidro

Lloret I Homs created the Barraquer Ophthalmology Center in Barcelona. A member of the GATCPAC he was nevertheless more influenced by the European style of the 1930s, the ideas of Bauhaus. Inaugurated in 1941 it is also well known for its spiral staircase.

His earlier work was in the style of modernism and included summer residences in Sant Andreu de Llavaneres

He is the architect of several emblematic palaces in the neighborhood of Sarria-Gervasi, Barcelona, like the Torre de San Fernando, 1920 built for Emilio Heydrich at the Calle Iradier 9, which since 1960 hosts the police station of the Mossos de Escuadra.La Quinta de San Isidro, 1920, is another impressive private palace, owned by Isidro Pons de Pascual, which was converted into the Cruz Blanca Clinical Center.

Apartment houses in the post-war style are the Rancho Grande, 1944 or his buildings at Josep Bernard Street. Most of his buildings are currently under official protection.
