= Fernando Heydrich =

German businessman, politician, engineer and sculptor

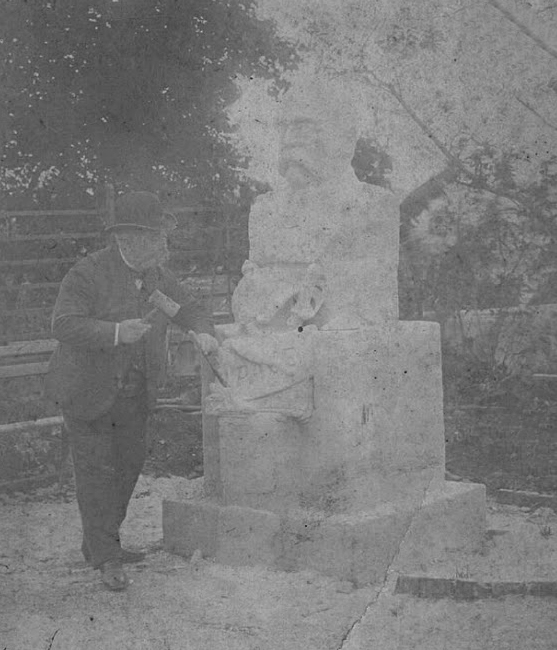
- Born: 1827; Barmen, German Confederation
- Died: 1903 (aged 75–76); Matanzas, Spanish Cuba
- Burial place: Necrópolis de San Carlos Borromeo
- Occupations: Engineer, sculptor, politician
- Known for: Founder of the Acueduct of Matanzas

Fernando Heydrich Klein (26 January 1827 – April 1, 1903) was a German businessman, politician, engineer and sculptor who lived in Matanzas, Cuba. Builder of the Aqueduct of Matanzas, he was politically engaged, playing a significant role during the Ten Years' War in Cuba.

Married to Maria-Candelaria Martínez y Valdez, he was father of American Consul Alfredo Heydrich and Emilio Heydrich; he was also an ancestor of the artists Daniel Garbade and Juan Esnard Heydrich. He died in 1903, and was laid to rest at the Necropolis San Carlos Borromeo, Matanzas.

== Aqueduct of Matanzas ==
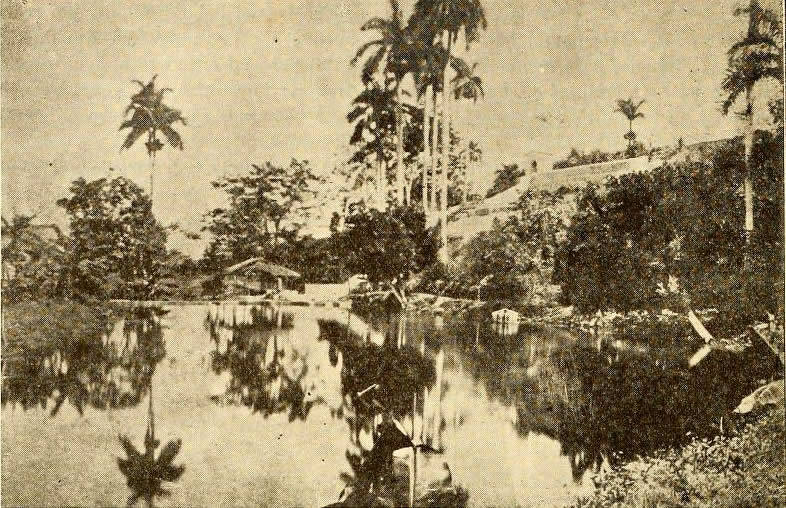
Manantial Bello, Aqueduct of Matanzas

In 1845, Manuel del Portillo successfully initiated the idea of an aqueduct for the supply of drinking water to Matanzas. Francis Albear y Lara, the engineer and chief, also encountered resistance. When Juan F. Sanchez and Bárcena also failed in a similar project, Fernando Heydrich proposed his own project together with G. Fabra and Cabanillas and his company, Heydrich & Cie, and received the order in 1870 to build a water channel from the springs of Manantial Bello y Benavides to Matanzas. They exploited the aqueduct til 1912. It still stands as a landmark of the city, and was chosen as a monument of the nation in 2005.

== Industry ==
Heydrich was one of the first producers of Sisal on the island. With his son Alfredo and his company Heydrich and Raffoler & Cie, he requested the patent, which he finally got after a long dispute and thus began a new kind of production in Cuba.

== Politics ==
During the insurrection of the rebels during the Ten Years' War, Fernando Heydrich played an essential role as founder and president of the Compania de Alemanes, also called the “Club Alemán”. Their task was the founding of a volunteer corps /militia to protect the goods of German and other foreign merchants. He received the explicit consent from Otto von Bismarck through a telegram to Consul Luis Will, in 1869, under the condition of preserving neutrality.
