= Theodore Garbade =

German-born Cuban merchant and banker

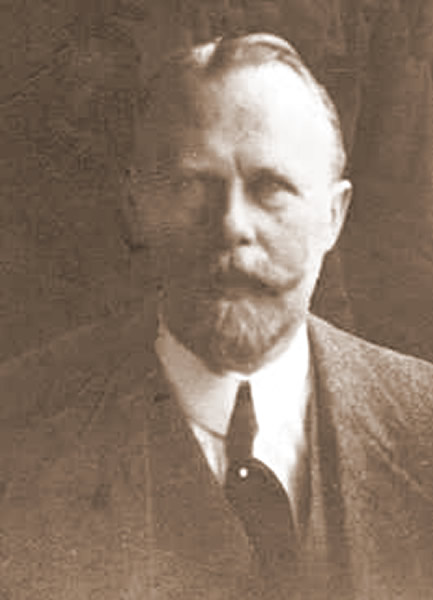
Garbade in 1916

Theodore Dietrich Garbade (12 September 1873 – 26 January 1961) was a merchant and banker. He was President of the Union of Manufacturers of Cigars of Cuba.

As a young man he moved from the German Zigarrenmacherdorf ("cigar-making village") of Hastedt, Bremen to Cuba where he worked as a leaf buyer for Hermann Dietrich Upmann and his tobacco company. He was President of the Union of Manufacturers of Cigars of Cuba, and joined H. Upmann as an associate member and became their partner at the bank H. Upmann & Co. till 1917 when he moved to New York. He was Head of the Chamber of Commerce in Cuba in 1917.

Garbade played a significant role in the settlement between Cuba and the United States after President Wilson succeeded in passing the Revenue Act of 1913. The act established the lowest rates since the Walker Tariff of 1857. Most schedules were ad valorem basis, a percentage of the value of the item. This had a profound impact for the Cuban tobacco industry concerning their import to the States. As President of the Union of Manufacturers of Cigars of Cuba Garbade, aided by an appointed committee, laid this out to Cuba's president Mario García Menocal in January 1914, insisting upon an allowance of 50 per cent on their exports of cigars as an equivalent in Cuba's next reciprocity treaty and urging a prompt solution of this matter so vital to the Cuban cigar industry.

A German citizen in the United States in 1916, he was considered prisoner of war, and put under house arrest in his mansion in Mount Kisko, New York. In 1919 he moved to San Sebastián, Spain and in 1921 to Lucerne, Switzerland where he applied for a Swiss passport. An owner of plantations and other properties in Cuba, he lost a great part of his fortune by confiscation in 1960 after the Cuban Revolution. He died only one year later. Garbade was married four times. Theodor Jr is son of his first spouse Graziella Aguirre del Monte who died in 1909. His second wife Aida Heydrich (1887–1920), daughter of Emilio Heydrich, gave him two sons: Robert D. Garbade (a filmmaker and first cameraman of the Swiss Television) and Bernhard R. Garbade, father of Swiss artist Daniel Garbade (director of Zurich Insurance Group, philanthropist and sponsor of Max Maag Church Organs). Theodore Garbade is buried with his last wife Hildegard von Ohlen (1903–1962) at the Flims Waldhaus cemetery, Switzerland.

== Literature ==
- Reginald Lloyd, Jose' Pla' Carceles: Twentieth Century Impressions of Cuba, Editor: Lloyd's Greater Britain publishing Company, Limited, 1913
- The Cuba Review and Bulletin, Editor:Munson Steamship Line, 1913
- United States Tobacco Journal, vol. 83, BMT Publications, 1915
- Sir Thomas Skinner: The London Banks and Kindred Companies and Firms, Editor: T. Skinner & Company, 1916
- Martin Torodash: Woodrow Wilson and the Tarriff (sic) Question: The Importance of the Underwood Act in His Reform Program.Editor: New York University, Graduate School of Arts and Science, 1966
- Alfredo Gómez Llorens: Instituciones y ciclo económico de la República de Cuba. Palibrio, 2014
- Noel Maurer: The Empire Trap: The Rise and Fall of U.S. Intervention to Protect American, Editor: Princeton University Press, 2013, ISBN 978-0-691-15582-1
