= Hermann Dietrich Upmann =

Cigar and banking magnate (1816–1894)

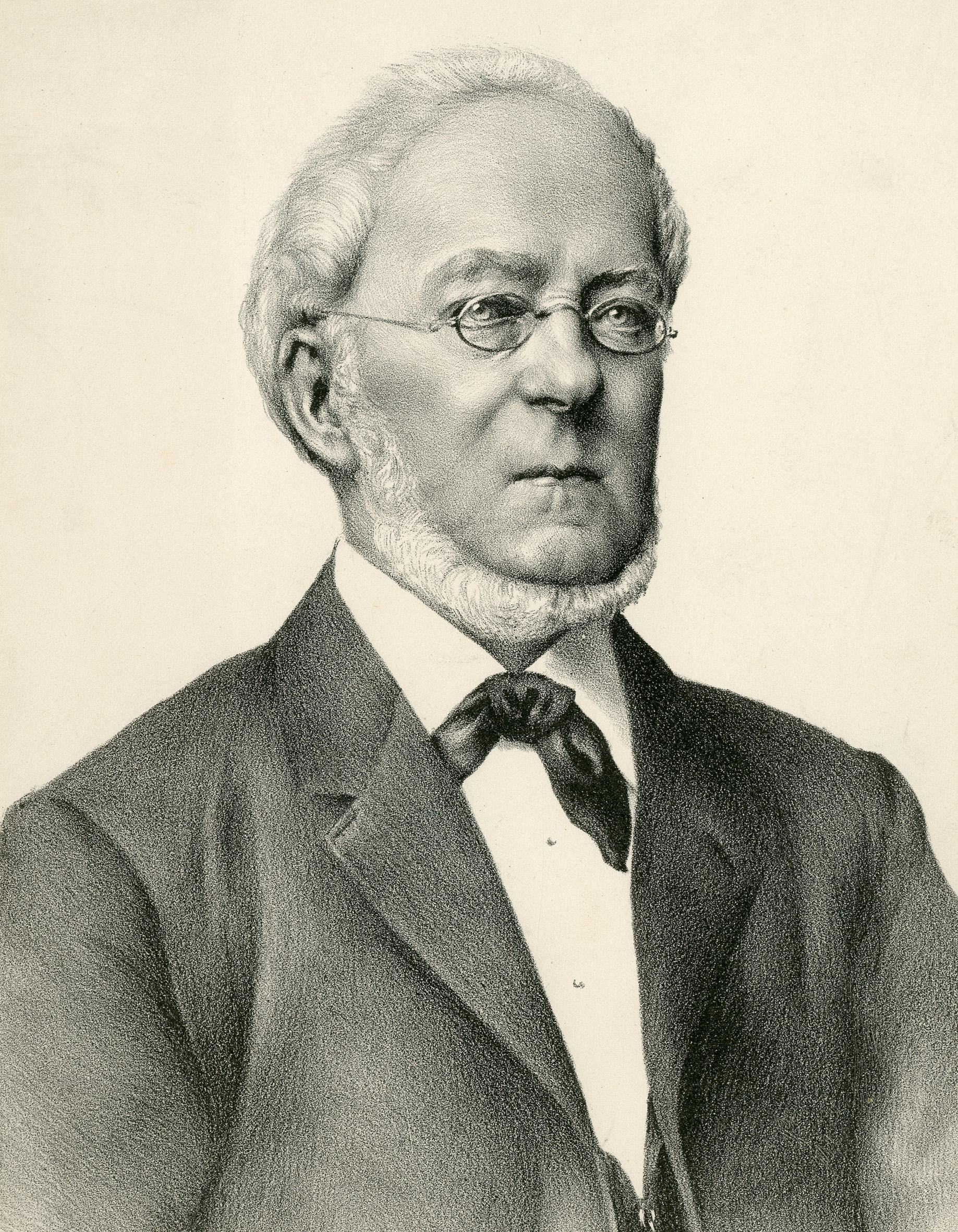
- Born: 1816; Bielefeld, Germany
- Died: 1894 (aged 77–78); Bremen, Germany
- Resting place: Riensberger Cemetery, Germany
- Monuments: Upmann Bank in Havanna, today it houses the Central Bank of Cuba (before called the Cuban National Bank
- Known for: Creator of the H.Upmann brand

Hermann Dietrich Upmann (1 May 1816–29 January 1894) was a banker, merchant, and cigar manufacturer in Cuba, creator of the H. Upmann 1844 brand.

Hermann Upmann was born and raised in Altstadt Bielefeld, Germany. At 23 years old, he embarked for the New World in 1839 to work for an import/export company, The Gravenhorst & Co. During the voyage, a Briton persuaded him to stay in Havana, Cuba, where the tobacco business was flourishing. Upmann accepted the suggestion. He learned the processes and secrets of cigar manufacturing, purchased a local cigar factory, and created the H. Upmann 1844 brand, which is among the oldest cigar brands in the world.

In 1855 he received the first of many prizes that he would obtain over the following years. He achieved the Royal warrant of appointment qualification of "Provider of His Majesty Don Alfonso XII, King of Spain". It was one of the five largest tobacco factories in Cuba. Upmann became a director of the Havana Cigar Brand Association, an organization that worked to confront the production and sale of counterfeit cigars.

He found the tropical climate in Cuba difficult, so he decided against a lasting stay. His youngest brother, August Ludwig Upmann (born 1818), started to work with him and stayed in Cuba. Hermann returned to Germany in 1848 and founded the cigar company Gebrüder Upmann & Co. Bremen.

In 1864, his nephew, Heinrich Upmann, arrived in Cuba. With capital contributed mainly by his uncle, they founded an organization dedicated to banking operations - initially catering to tobacco dealers and manufacturers, whose operations were spread through the Antilles. The company grew to such an extent that it was transformed into a vertical operation: they took care of the seedbeds, plant, harvest, manufacture, pack and, with their own shipping company, transported their products to other markets.

Upmann retired in 1890 and was succeeded at H. Upmann & Co. by his nephew, who continued the business with his partners Heinrich Runken and Theodore Garbade. The latter was president of the Union of Cigar manufacturers of the Island.

Upmann died in Bremen in 1894 and is buried in the Upmann family grave at the Riensberger Friedhof.
