= H. Upmann & Co. =

H. Upmann & Co. was a Bank based in Cuba, with a subsidiary branch in Bremen, Germany, it was founded in 1844 and presided over by Hermann Dietrich Upmann. It closed in 1922.

== History ==
H. Upmann & Co. was very successful through the purchase of promissory notes in Madrid during the Cuban War of Independence. Due to the American blockade during the war, the Spanish government was dependent on H. Upmann’s bank to finance its war efforts. Because of the unrest in Cuba, many bankers decided to withdraw their money from Cuba in 1896. As a representative of the Rothschilds and other important customers, H. Upmann & Co. transferred large quantities of gold and silver to its office in New York, which had been a financial center and trading hub with the Caribbean islands since the 18th century.

Joseph Herrings, a war correspondent, described the Upmann banking house as "the most important banking company in Cuba, perhaps in the whole of West India."

After the death of Hermann Friedrich Upmann in 1910, the bank was presided by his nephews, Hermann Friedrich and Albert Upmann and Theodore Garbade, a partner of the bank who quit the bank in 1916.

In Havana the bank built its own business house in Havana on the corner of the Amargura and Mercader’s streets. Built in 1904, it was the first building of its kind. It houses today the agency of the Central Bank of Cuba (before called the Cuban National Bank).

In 1917, H. Upmann's assets were seized by the Custodian of Alien Enemy properties in the United States, and the firm was placed on the US Enemy Trade List. With the end of World War I, in 1918, Cuba's economic situation had worsened dramatically, especially after its great crash 1920 that brought unfathomable consequences to thousands of workers who lost their jobs. Due to these difficulties, H. Upmann & Co. - like so many others - left in 1922 and was sold for a mere 30,000 pesos to the Habsburg Trust Havana Bank Three years later, on September 3, 1925, Herman passed away and his brother Albert moved to the United States.
