= Sant Adrià de Besòs railway station =

Railway station in Catalonia, Spain

Sant Adrià de Besòs Estació de Sant Adrià
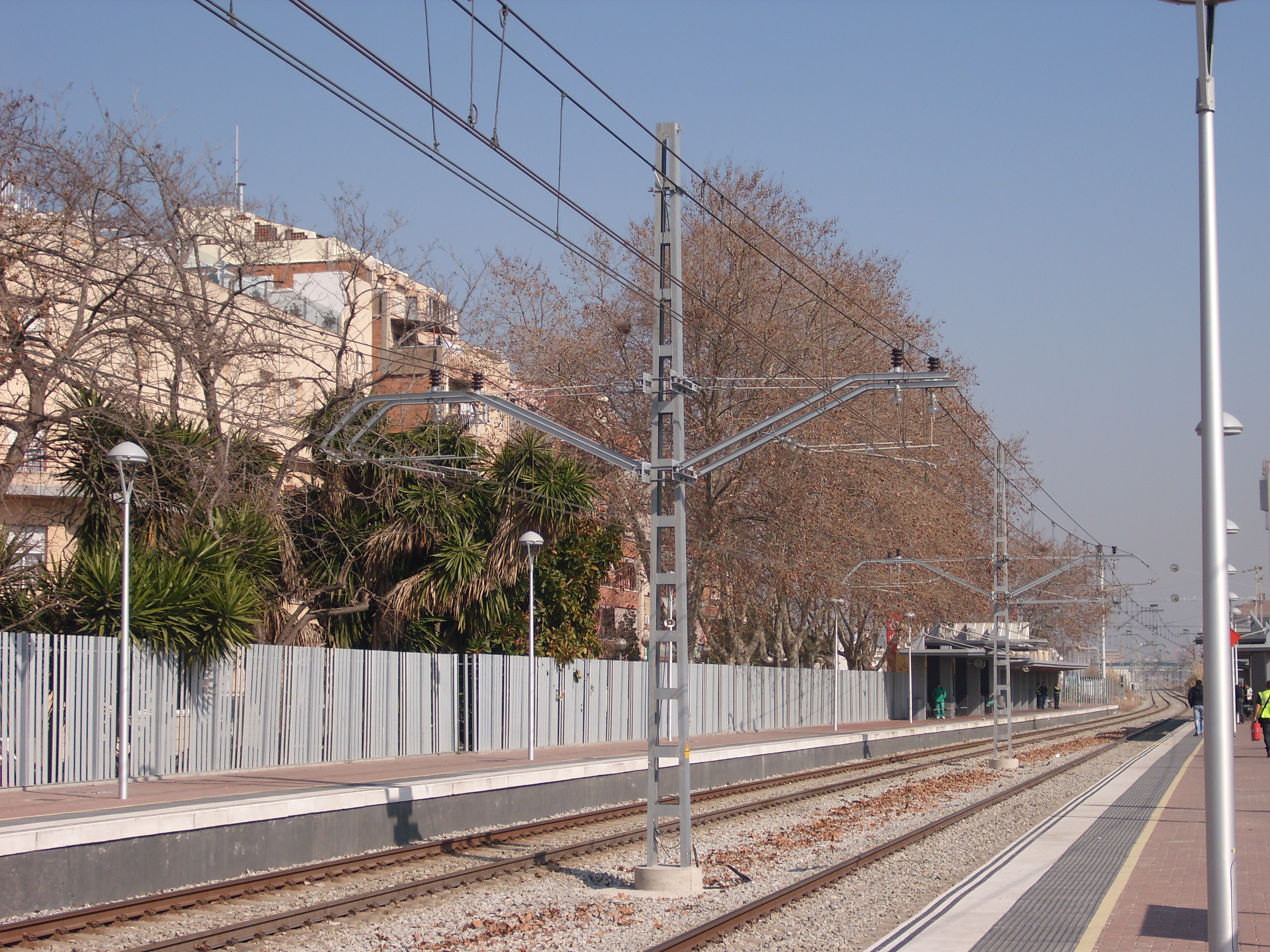
- The Rodalies de Catalunya station after refurbishment and renewal of the overhead equipment in 2012.

General information
- Location: Avinguda d'Eduard Maristany; 08930 Sant Adrià de Besòs; Catalonia; Spain
- Coordinates: 41°25′27″N 2°13′50″E
- System: Rodalies de Catalunya commuter rail station TRAM tram stop
- Owner: Adif (Rodalies de Catalunya); TRAM
- Operator: Renfe Operadora (Rodalies de Catalunya); TRAM
- Lines: Barcelona–Mataró–Maçanet-Massanes (PK 7.7); Trambesòs
- Platforms: 2 side platforms (Rodalies de Catalunya); 1 island platform (TRAM)
- Connections: Local and interurban buses

Construction
- Structure type: At-grade
- Cycle facilities: A bicycle parking rack is located adjacent to the Rodalies de Catalunya station building.
- Accessible: Yes

Other information
- Station code: 79403 (Rodalies de Catalunya)
- Fare zone: 1 (ATM Àrea de Barcelona and Rodalies de Catalunya's Barcelona commuter rail service)

History
- Opened: 10 October 1933 (Rodalies de Catalunya); 8 May 2004 (TRAM)

Services
Preceding station	Rodalies de Catalunya	Following station
Barcelona El Clot-Aragó towards Molins de Rei	R1	Badalona towards Maçanet-Massanes
Barcelona El Clot-Aragó towards L'Hospitalet de Llobregat	RG1	Badalona towards Portbou
Preceding station	TRAM	Following station
Central Tèrmica del Besòs towards Ciutadella – Vila Olímpica	T4	Terminus
Central Tèrmica del Besòs towards Glòries	T6	Terminus
Location

Sant Adrià de Besòs and Estació de Sant Adrià (Catalan for "Sant Adrià Station") are a Rodalies de Catalunya commuter rail station and a Trambesòs tram stop, respectively, together forming an interchange station complex in Sant Adrià de Besòs, to the north-east of Barcelona, in Catalonia, Spain. The Rodalies de Catalunya station is on the Barcelona to Maçanet-Massanes via Mataró railway, between Barcelona El Clot-Aragó and Badalona. It is operated by Renfe Operadora and is served by Barcelona commuter rail service line R1 and Girona commuter rail service line RG1. The Trambesòs stop is the northern terminus of routes T4 and T6 and is operated by TRAM.

== History ==
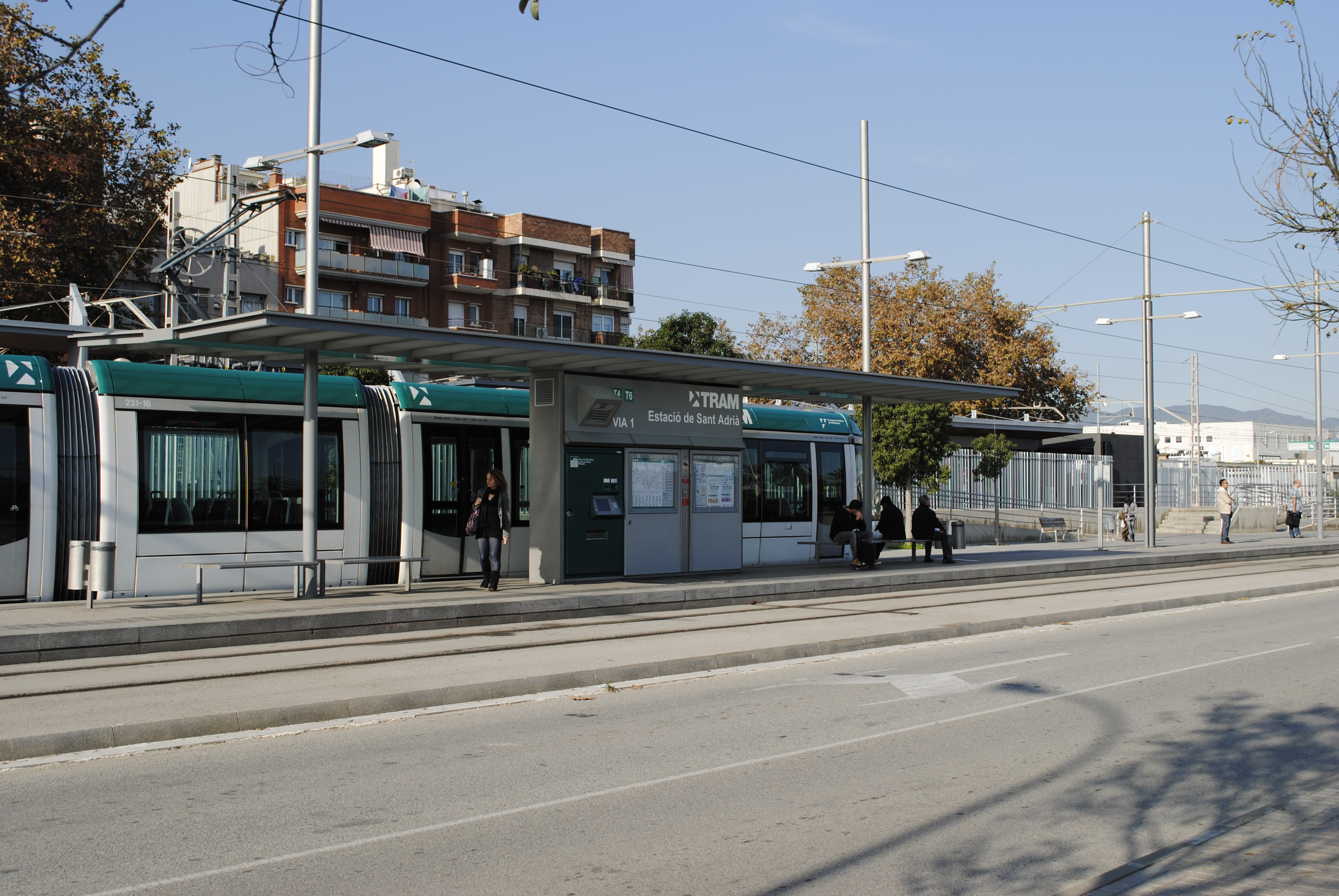
The Trambesòs stop, with the Rodalies de Catalunya station just behind it

Although the Barcelona–Mataró Railway, the first railway line in the Iberian Peninsula, passed through Sant Adrià de Besòs, it did not have any kind of stop in the municipality when it was opened on 18 October 1848. However, since several local factories were connected to the railway line, its opening was a major boost for the town’s economy. In 1888, with the opening of a steam tram line that travelled from Barcelona to Badalona, communications in the area were improved when a stop serving this new tram line was built in town.

In mid-1933, due to popular demand, Compañía de los Ferrocarriles de Madrid a Zaragoza y Alicante (M.Z.A.; "Madrid, Zaragoza and Alicante Railway Company") started the economic process to build a small halt on the Barcelona–Mataró Railway in Sant Adrià de Besòs. The new halt eventually started services on 10 October of that year. At that time, it was mainly served by commuter trains and did not have any ticket office so that tickets had to be bought on-train.

On 8 May 2004, the first section of the Trambesòs system, which travelled from Barcelona's Plaça de les Glòries Catalanes to this stop, was opened as part of route T4. Four years later, on 16 June 2008, new route T6 was launched and started serving this stop. Although the T6 initially ran between this stop and Gorg metro station in Badalona via the Sant Adrià de Besòs neighbourhood of La Mina, since the restructuring of the Trambesòs system applied on 20 February 2012, the T6 terminates at Plaça de les Glòries Catalanes instead of Gorg.

On 24 March 2014, Girona commuter rail service line RG1, which is actually an extension of Barcelona commuter rail service line R1 towards Portbou, was launched and started serving the Rodalies de Catalunya station.

== Station layout ==
The Rodalies de Catalunya station consists of two tracks served by their respective side platforms, which are partially covered by metal shelters and communicated by an underpass equipped with stairs and elevators. A small station building is located on the left side of the tracks, looking north, which consists of a single storey where there is a hall hosting the ticket gates to the platforms, ticket vending machines and a ticket office. On the opposite side of the station building, there are also some ticket gates providing direct access to the street and the Trambesòs stop.

The Trambesòs stop lies parallel to the Rodalies de Catalunya station, at the same level, in order to make transfers between the two transport modes easier. Located at the southernmost side of the railway station, the tram stop has two tracks served by an island platform equipped with the usual TRAM metal shelter, which includes ticket vending machines and information screens. As it is a terminus stop, the platform is slightly longer, so that two tramcars can be parked on each track.

== Accessibility ==
In recent years, lifting platforms for wheelchair people were installed at the accesses to the underpass of the Rodalies de Catalunya station. They, nevertheless, did not work very often and received several complaints from a local association of physically disabled people. Thus, in order to improve the station's accessibility, in mid-2010, a complete renovation of the station with a budget of €740,000 was announced by Adif, the owner of the station. The works were completed on 28 July 2011 and involved the renovation of the railway platforms as well as the installation of two elevators in order to replace those lifting platforms, among other upgrading operations.

On the other hand, the Trambesòs stop, as well as the rest of TRAM’s stops, was already designed to be accessible.
