= Gorg station =

Metro station in Barcelona, Spain

Gorg
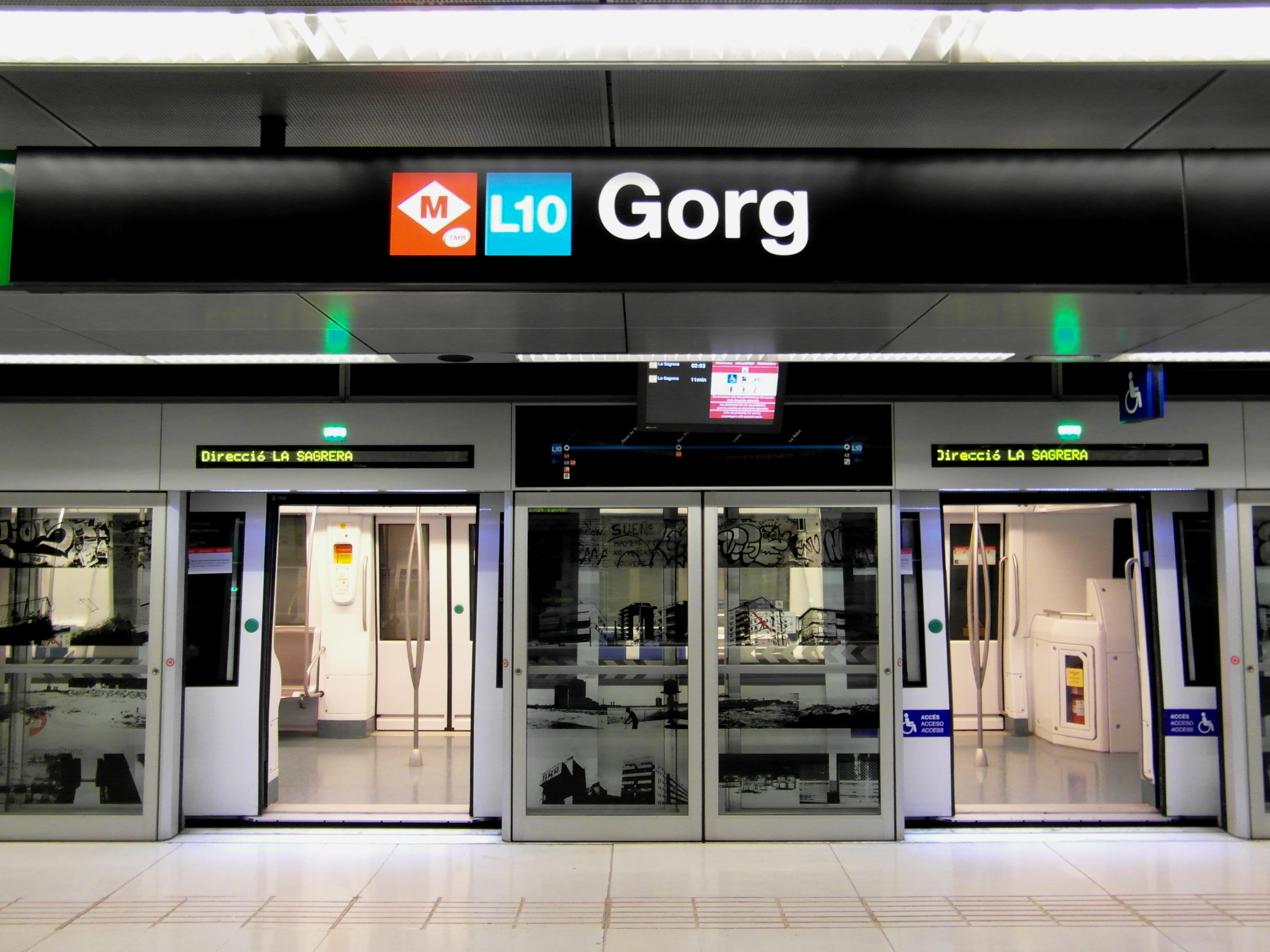
- Platform at L10 metro station

General information
- Location: Marquès de Mont-Roig, s/n 08918 Badalona
- Coordinates: 41°26′25.66″N 2°14′1.8″E
- System: TMB rapid transit station complex TRAM tram stop
- Operator: Transports Metropolitans de Barcelona and TRAM
- Platforms: 2 side platforms for Barcelona Metro line 2, 1 island platform for line 10 and another island platform for Trambesòs
- Connections: Local and interurban buses

Construction
- Structure type: Underground (Barcelona Metro); At-grade (Trambesòs)
- Accessible: yes

Other information
- Fare zone: 1 (Autoritat del Transport Metropolità)

History
- Opened: 22 April 1985 (Metro L2); 8 September 2007 (Trambesòs); 18 April 2010 (Metro L10)

Services
Preceding station	Metro	Following station
Sant Roc towards Paral·lel	L2	Pep Ventura towards Badalona Pompeu Fabra
La Salut towards La Sagrera	L10 Nord	Terminus
Projected
La Salut towards Polígon Pratenc	L10	Terminus
Location
- Location within Barcelona

Gorg (Catalan pronunciation: [ˈɡork]) is a Barcelona Metro and Trambesòs complex named after the neighbourhood of the same name where the station is situated, in Badalona municipality. It is located on Avinguda del Marquès de Mont-Roig and very close to Palau Municipal d'Esports de Badalona, the home arena of the professional basketball club Joventut de Badalona. It is served by TMB-operated Barcelona Metro lines L2 and L10, and Trambesòs route T5.

== History ==
The first station in Gorg was opened on 22 April 1985, when Barcelona Metro line 4 opened its platforms with the extension of this line from La Pau to Pep Ventura stations. On 1 October 2003, the Barcelona Metro line 4 section from La Pau to Pep Ventura was transferred to Barcelona Metro line 2 and because of this change, the station was rehabilitated and adapted for disabled persons by installing escalators and elevators.

On 8 September 2007, with the extension of Trambesòs network from Sant Adrià de Besòs to Badalona, Gorg stop was opened and became the terminus station of Trambesòs in Badalona. It was planned to open the station a few months earlier, but due to several complaints from neighbors to relocate the electric substation that feeds the line, its opening was delayed for several times. Until 15 June 2008, the station was served only by route T5, but with the opening of the branch via La Mina, route T6 began serving the station, allowing access to Sant Adrià de Besòs railway station from Gorg. Since 20 February 2012 and due to a restructuring of the network, route T6 no longer serves the station and instead of finishing in Gorg, it does it at Glòries.

Barcelona Metro line 10 arrived at the station on 18 April 2010, with the opening of the line from this station to Bon Pastor. The President of the Generalitat presided the inauguration ceremony of the station and travelled from this station to Bon Pastor to inaugurate this new branch of the line in Badalona. The initial forecast was to open the station in 2004 and later in 2008, but given the setbacks, did not become operational until 2010.

== Layout ==
=== Barcelona Metro ===
==== Line 2 ====
Barcelona Metro line 2 station is located under the intersection of Avinguda del Marquès de Mont-Roig and Antoni Bori street. The station has two accesses from the street, one situated on Alfons XIII Avenue and equipped with fixed stairs and an elevator, and the other one situated on Guifré street. Both accesses are joined in a same hall located in the central part of the station. The trains run on the lower level that consists of two tracks served by two 94 meter long side platforms. The lower level and the hall are linked by fixed stairs, escalators and elevators. Since April 2010 and because of the opening of the L10 station, on the Pep Ventura side some escalators and elevators were installed with the construction of an access to the L10 station.

==== Line 10 ====
Barcelona Metro line 10 station is located under the intersection of Avinguda del Marquès de Mont-Roig and Pau Claris street. Unlike most L9/L10 stations, this station was not built using a well and was built using slurry walls at very shallow depths. The station has a single level and a single entrance from Alfons XII street, between Antoni Bori and Ponent streets. This access is equipped with fixed stairs, escalators and elevators, making the station accessible for disabled persons. This entrance leads to the main hall, situated at the end of the tracks where there is a TMB Control Center, ticket vending machines, the ticket gates and other facilities. There are two tracks served by a 108 meter long island platform where there are two groups of accesses that link it with each platform of the line 2 station independently. The architectural design of the station was designed by architect Alfons Soldevila Barbosa.

=== Trambesòs ===
Trambesòs stop is located on Avinguda del Marquès de Mont-Roig, between Joaquim Ruyra and Pau Claris streets. The stop is incorporated on the space exclusively used for the circulation of Trambesòs situated in the middle of the road surface, between the two driving sides. The trains run through two tracks served by a central platform equipped with a shelter, ticket vending machines and information screens.

== Gallery ==
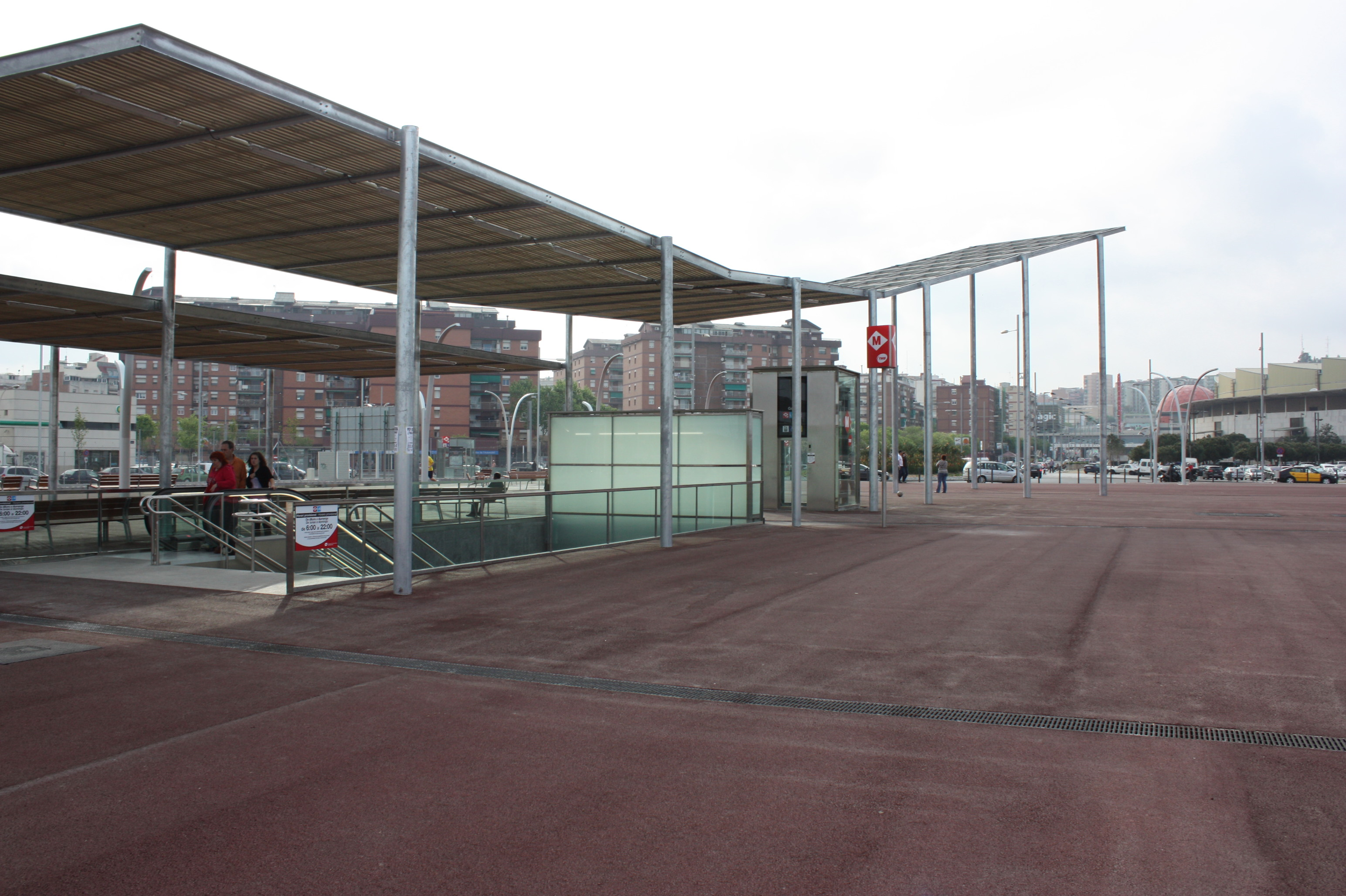
Access to L10 station

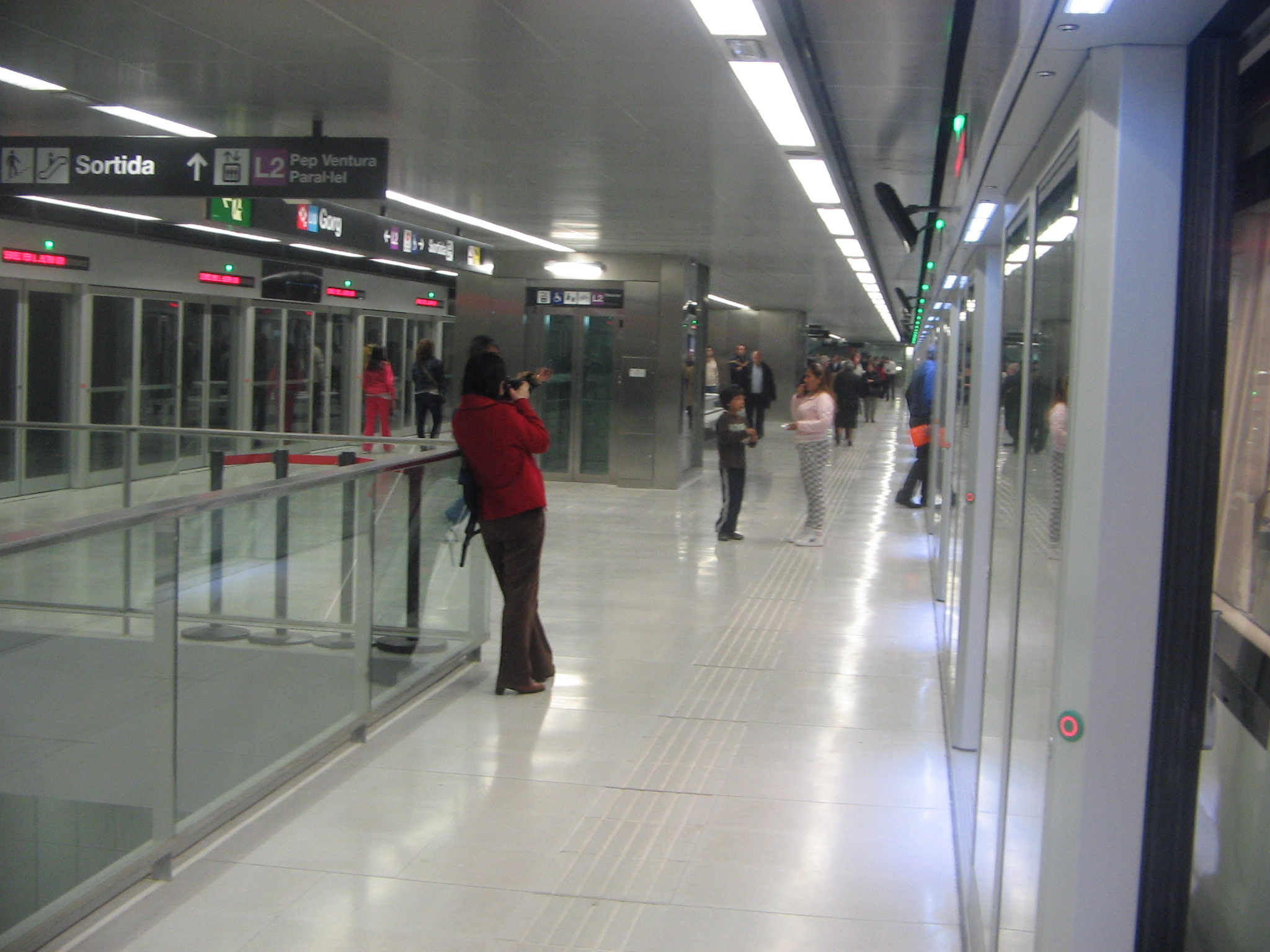
Platform screen doors at the L10 island platform

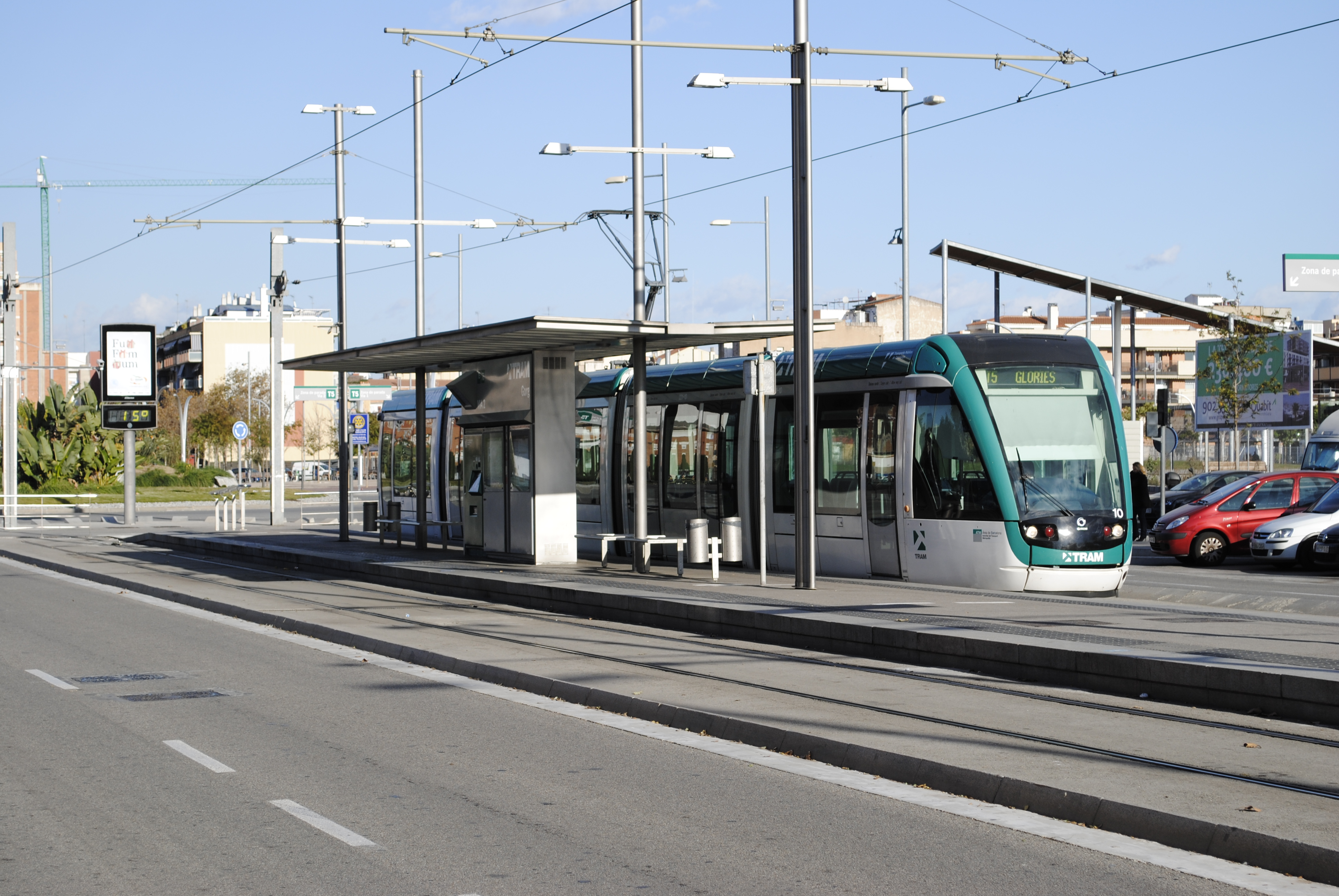
Trambesòs stop with a tram towards Glòries

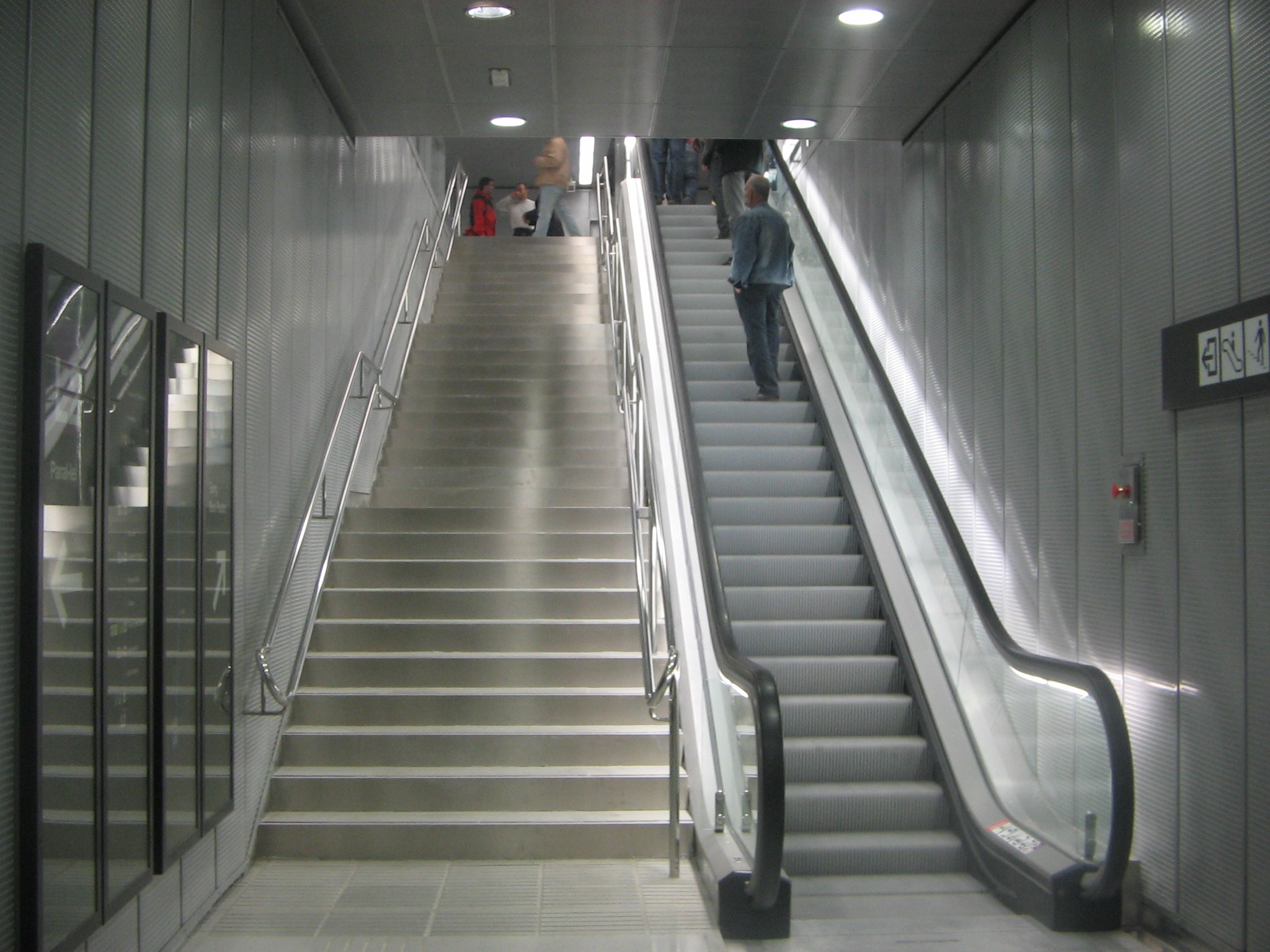
One of the accesses to the L10 platform from line 2
