= Trams in Barcelona =

Overview of the tram system of Barcelona, Spain

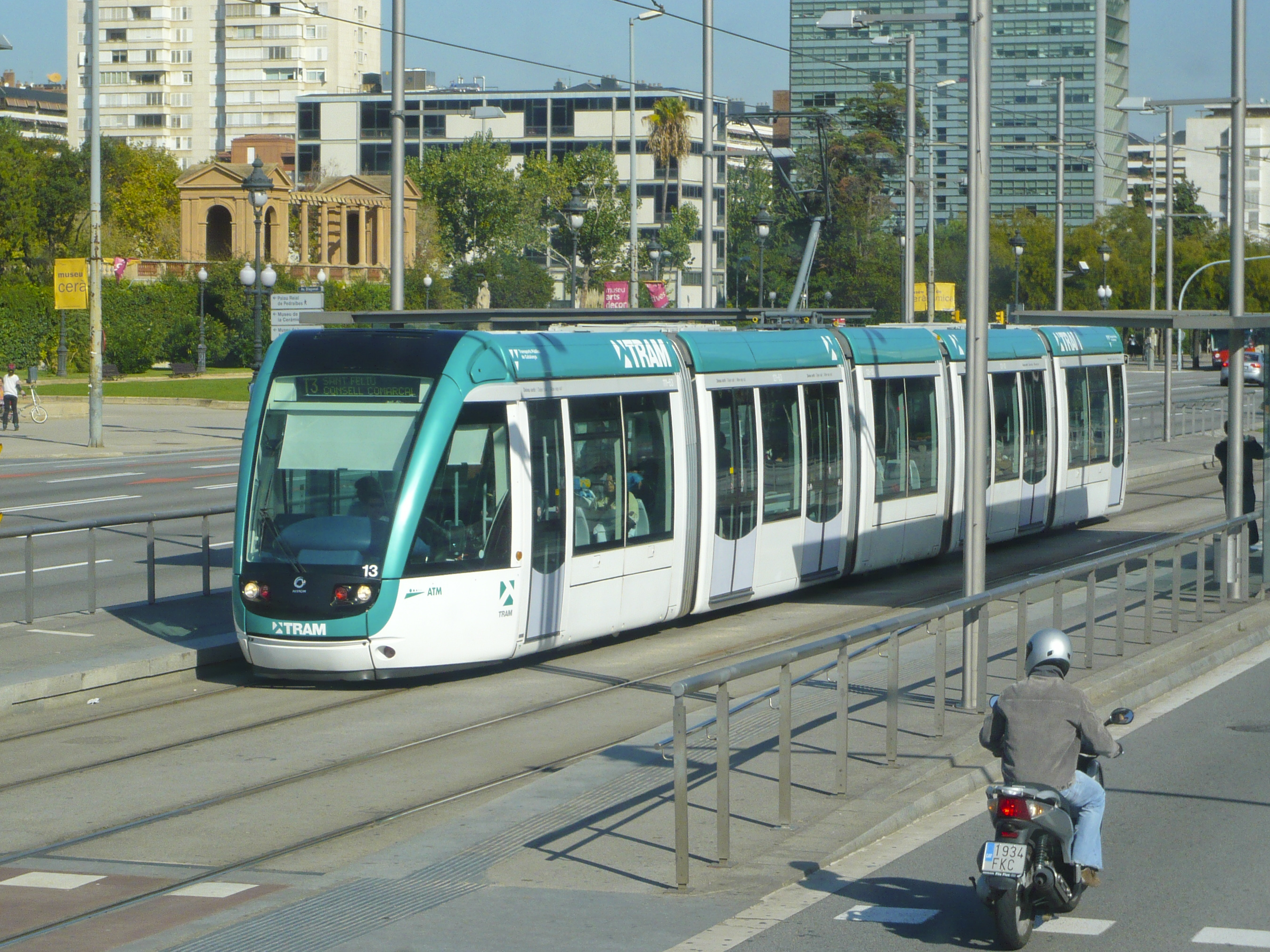
- Trambaix tram at Palau Reial stop

Operation
- Locale: Barcelona
- Open: 1872
- Status: open
- Routes: 7
- Operator: TMB (1 route); TramMet (6 routes in 2 systems)

Infrastructure
- Track gauge: 1,435 mm (4 ft 8 1/2 in) standard gauge
- Propulsion system: electric

Statistics
Overview

Historically, the city of Barcelona, in the Spanish autonomous community of Catalonia, had a large tramway network. The city's first tram line opened in 1872, but almost all of these historic lines had closed by 1971, being replaced by buses and by the expanding Barcelona Metro. The one remaining line, the Tramvia Blau, was retained as a tourist attraction, using historic rolling stock. However at the beginning of the 21st century, two new tram systems, the Trambaix and Trambesòs, began service in the suburbs of the city.

== History ==
The first tramway line in Barcelona was the Barcelona-Gràcia (Josepets), a horse tramway that opened by the Barcelona Tramways company on 28 June 1872. Within a few years, lines were built throughout Barcelona and many of its surrounding villages. As the tramways helped to integrate the metropolis, these villages became quarters of today's Barcelona. In the Eixample expansion planned by the Cerdà Plan, the tramways found that the wide streets and intersections with block chamfers allowed easy turns.

Lines were built by a number of companies, but by the 1900s the two main companies were Barcelona Tramways and Compañía General de Tranvías. Electrification took place in the 1900s, with the introduction of route numbers following from 1910 onwards. In 1925, the two main companies merged to Tranvías de Barcelona (TB). The Spanish Civil War (1936–39) caused major damage to the tramways.

On 1 March 1951 citizens launched a two-week boycott of the trams against a fare increase.

Services recovered in the 1950s and 1960s, and double-decker trams were used to operate some services. In the early 1960s, a fleet of 101 PCC cars were purchased second-hand from the United States city of Washington, D.C. and, after modifications, placed into service in Barcelona.

However, closures then began to occur. With the exception of the Tramvia Blau, the last two tramway lines ceased operations on 18 March 1971. For the next thirty years or so, this one short line was the only tramway in Barcelona.

Towards the end of the 1980s a number of new tramways were opened in other European cities, and Barcelona started to consider the possibility of building new lines. To test this idea, in 1997 a short test tramway was built along the Diagonal with just two tram stops. Tests were conducted with a tram from the Grenoble tram system in June 1997, and a month later with a Siemens Combino.

The tests were successful, and the decision was made to build two new tram systems, both operating on parts of the Diagonal, although not interconnected. Both lines commenced operation in 2004, with TramBaix in the west starting on 5 April, whilst Trambesòs in the east commenced on 8 May.

By November 2026, the agency responsible for municipal infrastructure has put out tenders to construct a link between Trambaix and Trambesòs along the Diagonal. The agency expects to sign a contract by spring 2027, start construction in the summer and finish that work within 40 months.

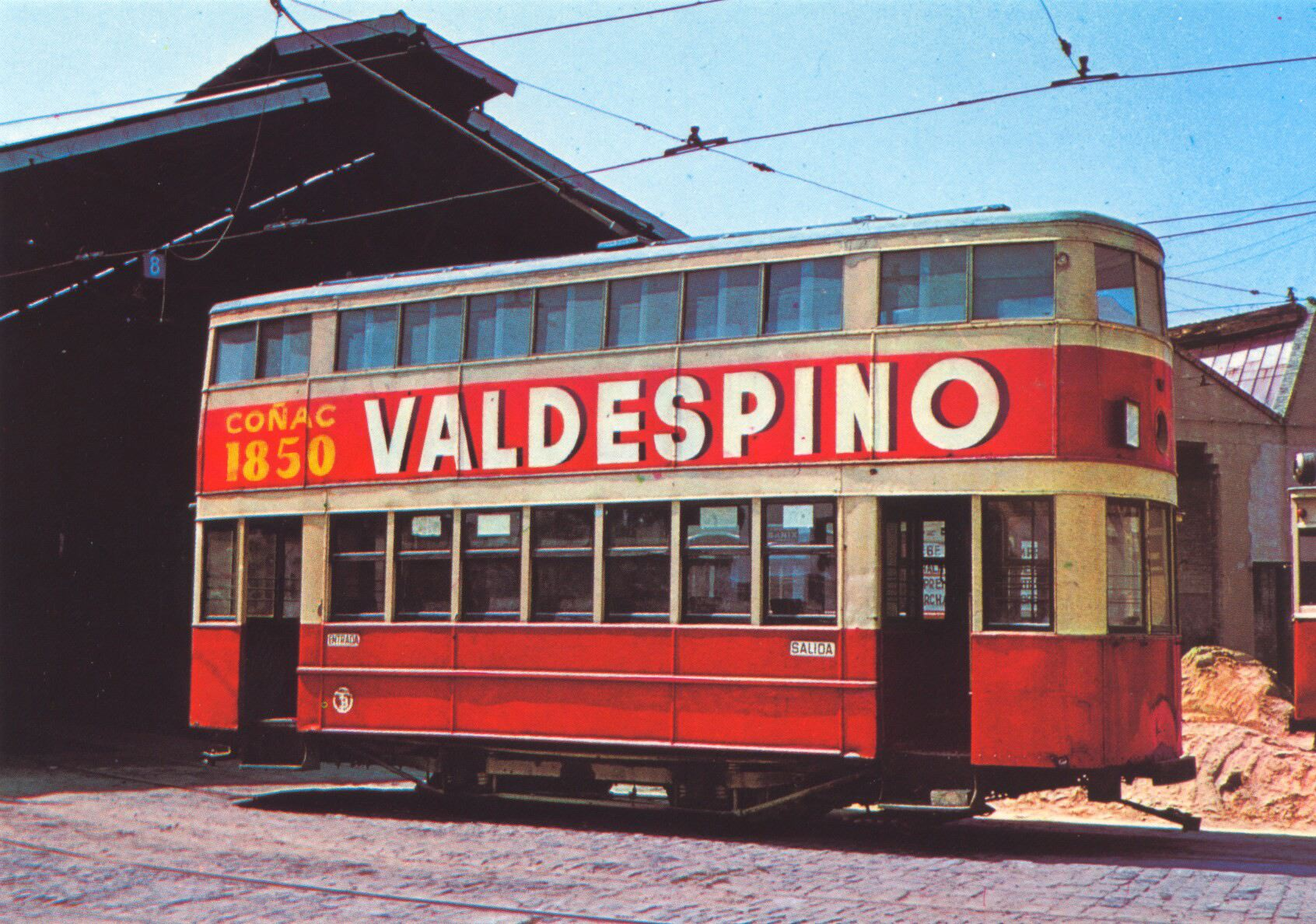
One of Barcelona's double-decker trams

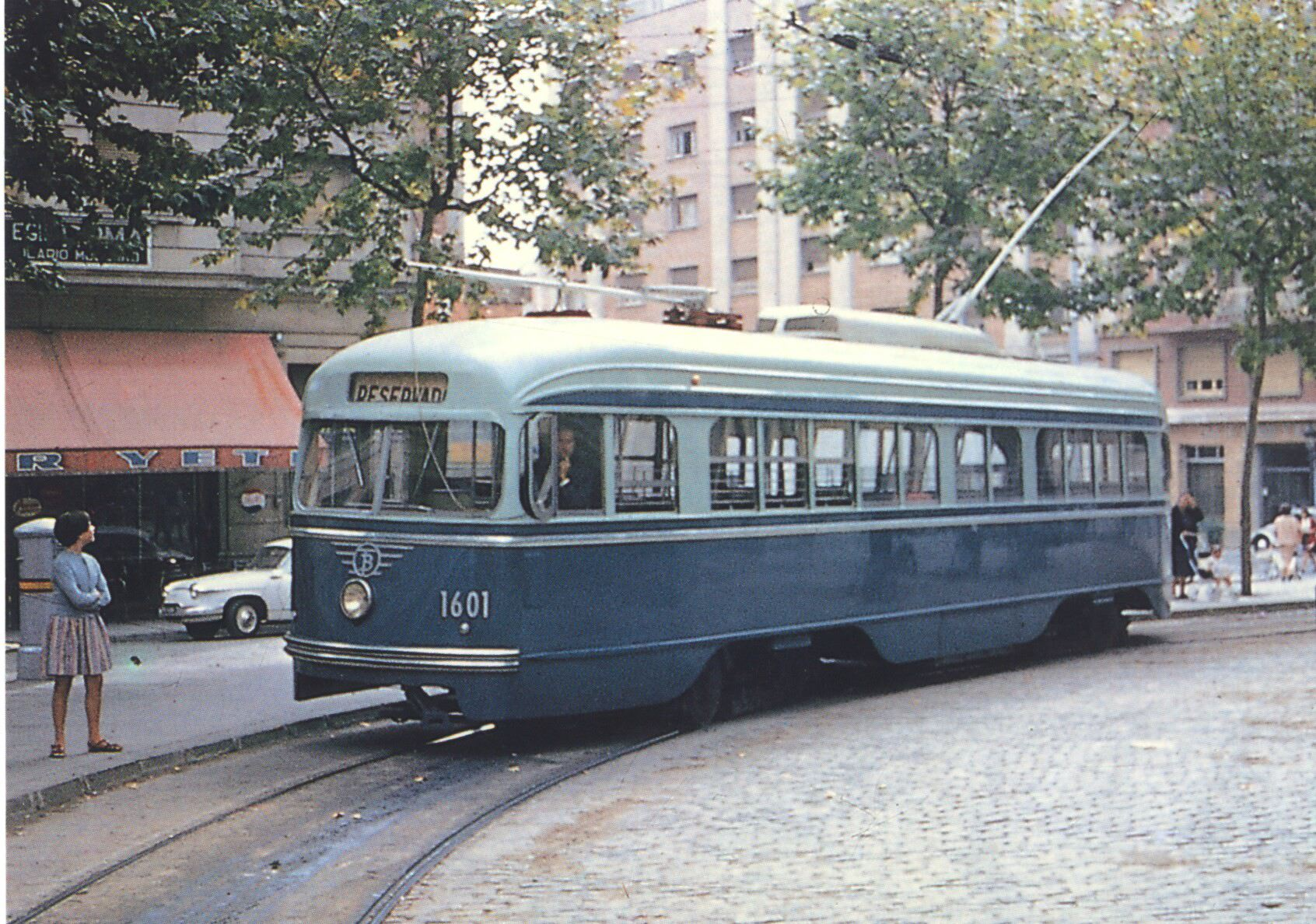
A PCC car bought second-hand from Washington

== Accidents ==
On 7 June 1926, architect Antoni Gaudí was struck by a passing number 30 tram of Les Tramways de Barcelone and lost consciousness. Assumed to be a beggar, the unconscious Gaudí did not receive immediate aid. Gaudí died on 10 June 1926 at the age of 73 and was buried two days later.

== Current network ==
=== Tramvia Blau ===
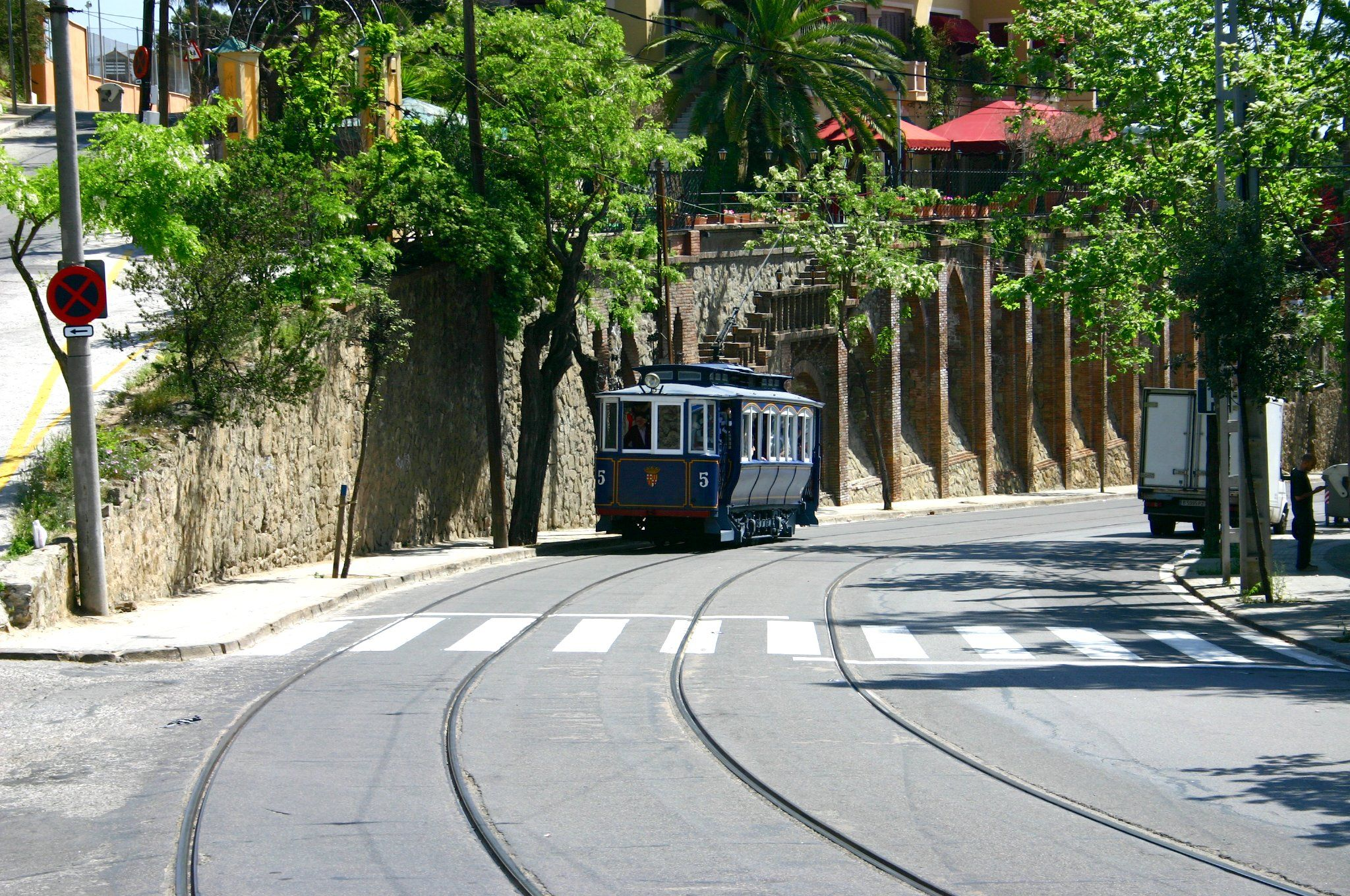
Tramvia Blau

The Tramvia Blau is a 1.3 km (0.81 mi) long heritage streetcar line serving a hilly area of the Sarrià-Sant Gervasi district. It links the Avinguda Tibidabo terminus of Barcelona Metro line L7 with the lower station of the Funicular del Tibidabo, thus providing part of a through link from the city centre to Tibidabo. It has been closed for reconstruction since spring 2018, with no known date scheduled for reopening.

Tramvia Blau is operated by Transports Metropolitans de Barcelona (TMB), albeit not part of Autoritat del Transport Metropolità (ATM) and therefore not fare-integrated with the other public transport networks of the metropolitan area; ticketing is paid cash only to the tram operators. The line is operated with a fleet of seven tram cars dating from 1901 to 1906.

=== Trambaix ===
Trambaix

The Trambaix is a light rail (tram) system connecting the Baix Llobregat area with the city of Barcelona. It includes three routes (T1, T2 and T3), which have an inner terminus at Plaça Francesc Macià, to the west of the city centre, and extend west, passing L'Hospitalet de Llobregat, Esplugues de Llobregat, Cornellà de Llobregat, Sant Joan Despí, Sant Just Desvern and Consell Comarcal in Sant Feliu de Llobregat.

The Trambaix is operated by the TramMet company and is part of the ATM network and is fare-integrated with the other public transport networks of the metropolitan area. The line uses a fleet of Alstom Citadis trams.

=== Trambesòs ===
Trambesòs

Trambesòs is a light rail (tram) system, consisting of three routes (T4, T5 and T6) that connect the district of Sant Martí in Barcelona to Badalona and Sant Adrià de Besòs municipalities. Its name comes from the union of the words "tram", an abbreviation of the Catalan word tramvia, and "Besòs", the name of an area in northern Barcelonès dominated by river Besòs.

Like the Trambaix, Trambesòs is operated by the TramMet company and is part of the ATM network and is fare-integrated with the other public transport networks of the metropolitan area. It uses the same type of rolling stock as the Trambaix system.

In November 2024, a new 1.8 km section of tramway, which is the first phase in the connection of the Trambaix and Trambesòs networks, was opened to the public, adding three new stations: Monumental (allowing a transfer to L2), Sicília and Verdaguer (which has an interchange with L4 and L5), as well as the reconstruction of the Glòries station.

== See also ==
- List of tram stops in Barcelona metropolitan area
- Barcelona Traction – Utility/transport company in Catalonia
