= La Vila Olímpica del Poblenou =

Coordinates: 41°23′27″N 2°11′57″E

Vila Olímpica
- Neighbourhood of Barcelona
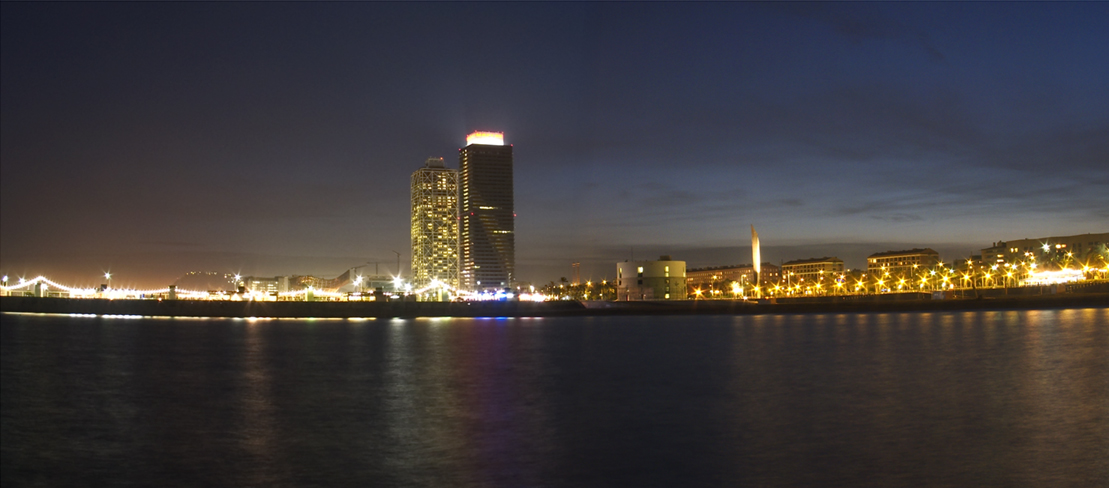
- At the left, the Port Olímpic de Barcelona, at the center, the high rises Hotel Arts and Torre Mapfre, and at the right, buildings of the Olympic Village
- Interactive map of Vila Olímpica
- Country: Spain
- Autonomous Community: Catalonia
- Province: Barcelona
- Comarca: Barcelonès
- Municipality: Barcelona
- District: Sant Martí

Area
  - Total: 0.943 km^{2} (0.364 sq mi)

Population
  - Total: 9,338
  - Density: 9,900/km^{2} (25,600/sq mi)

La Vila Olímpica del Poblenou or La Vila Olímpica (Catalan pronunciation: [lə ˈβilə uˈlimpikə ðəl ˌpɔbːləˈnɔw]; The Olympic Village of Poblenou) is a neighborhood in the Sant Martí district of Barcelona, Catalonia (Spain). It was constructed in the late 1980s and early 1990s for the 1992 Summer Olympic Games which took place in Barcelona. Its construction was devised by Oriol Bohigas, David Mackay, and Albert Puigdomènec as a residential area in the otherwise industrial and working-class district of Poblenou, which underwent regeneration but involved massive expropriation, as well as the destruction of a sizeable portion of the district, including Industrial Revolution factories of architectural value such as Fàbrica Foret. It follows essentially the reticular outline of Eixample and Poblenou, with about 2000 new apartments in the area, owned by the mixed public-private company VOSA (Vila Olímpica Societat Anònima).

== Education ==
The main campus of Universitat Pompeu Fabra is located between Parc de la Ciutadella and this neighbourhood. The buildings are former barracks which underwent restoration simultaneously with the construction of Vila Olímpica.

== Architecture ==
The Port Olímpic de Barcelona is located in this neighborhood. The buildings in Vila Olímpica were designed by a number of winners of the FAD Award. The area includes the high rises Hotel Arts and Torre Mapfre, both of which are 154 m tall and were built in 1992.

The Torre Mapfre is located in this neighborhood, while the Hotel Arts, the Casino Barcelona and the Peix d'Or (goldfish), a large metal sculpture designed by Frank Gehry, are located at one edge of the Barceloneta neighborhood, close to the border with the Vila Olímpica del Poblenou.

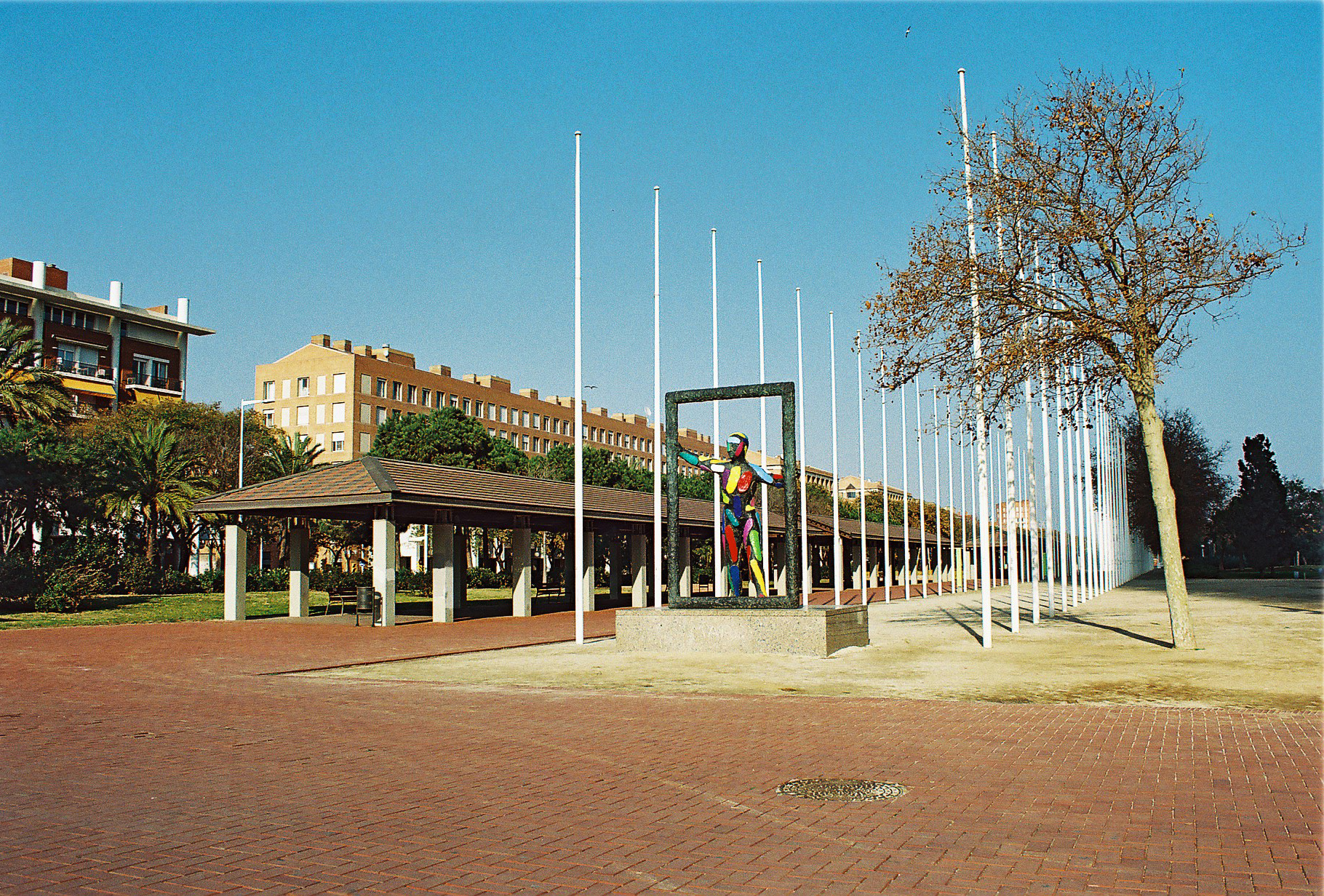
Parc of the Port Olímpic de Barcelona, a park located in this neighbourhood

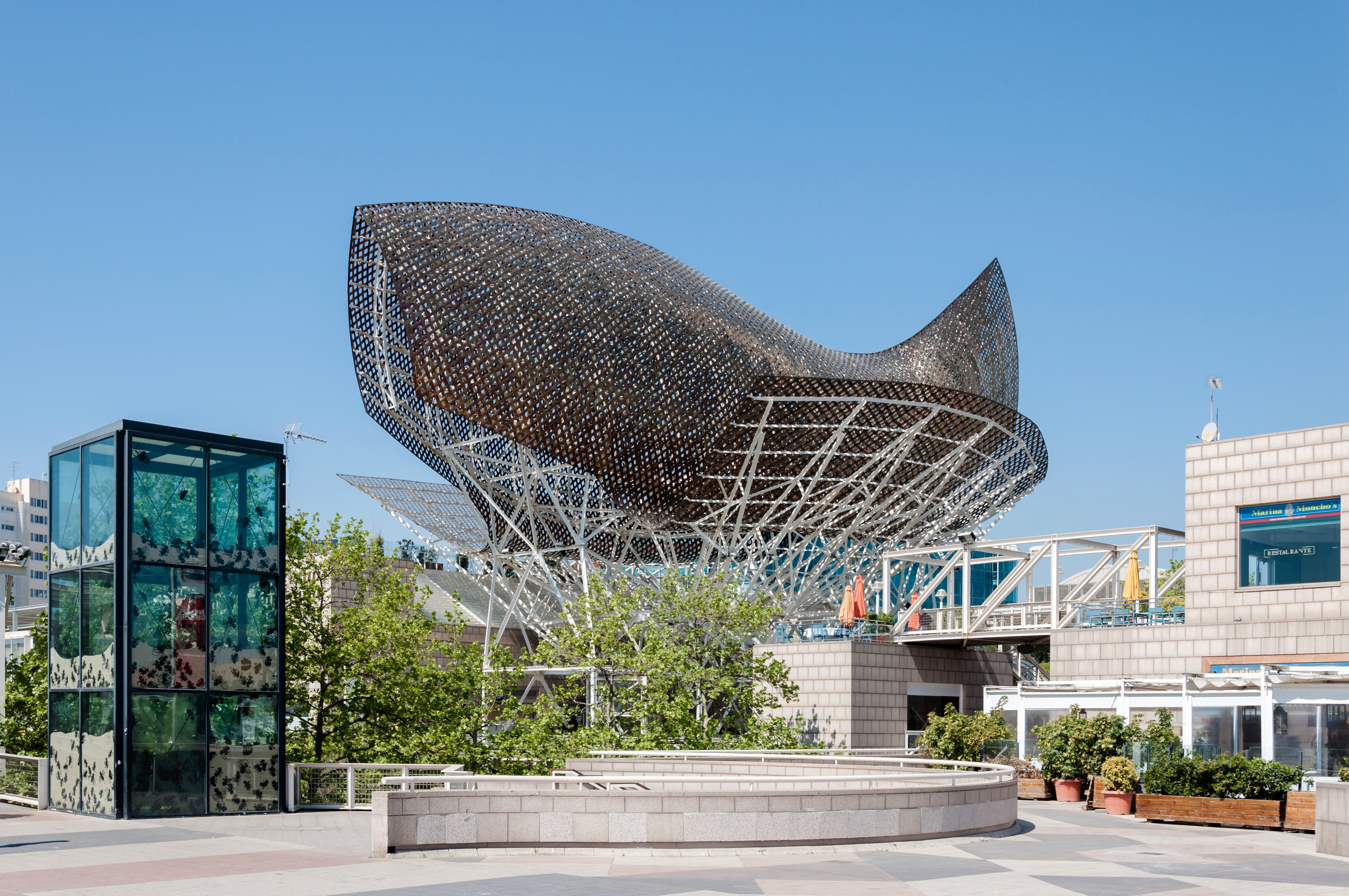
El Peix (1992) by Frank Gehry, Passeig Marítim de la Barceloneta

== Transport ==
- Barcelona Metro stations Vila Olímpica and Bogatell, both on line L4
- Trambesòs tram stops Ciutadella | Vila Olímpica (connection with Barcelona Metro) and Wellington

== See also ==
- Urban planning of Barcelona

== Bibliography ==
- Francesc Xavier Hernàndez i Cardona, Barcelona, història d'una ciutat. Llibres de l'Índex, Barcelona, 2001.
