= Marina station =

Metro station in Barcelona, Spain

Marina
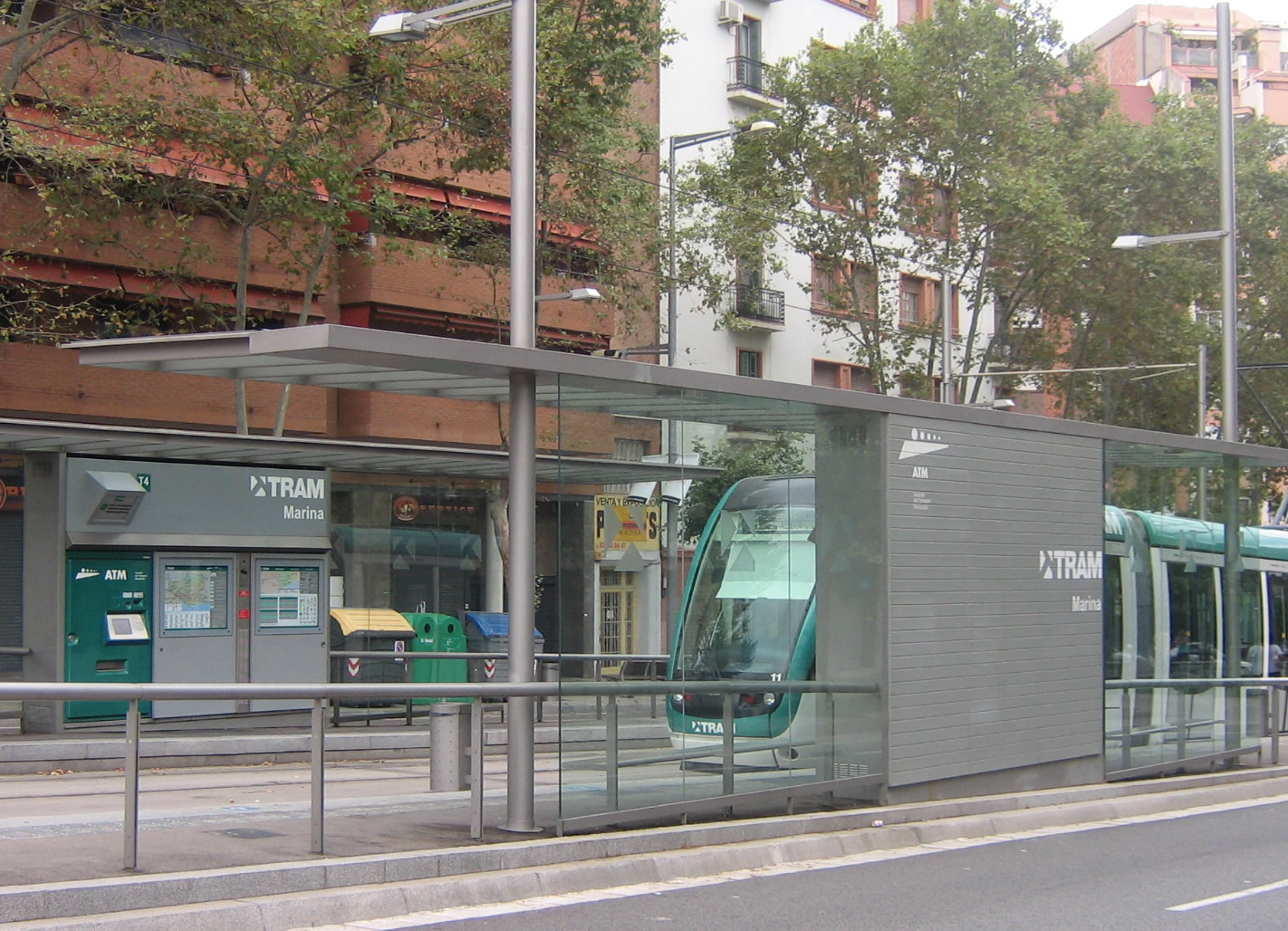
- The Marina tram stop

General information
- Location: Barcelona (Eixample/Sant Martí)
- Coordinates: 41°23′40″N 2°11′12″E
- System: Barcelona Metro rapid transit station Trambesòs tram stop
- Operator: Transports Metropolitans de Barcelona; TramMet

Other information
- Fare zone: 1 (ATM)

History
- Opened: 1933 (as a metro station); 2004 (as a tram stop)

Services
Preceding station	Metro	Following station
Arc de Triomf towards Hospital de Bellvitge	L1	Glòries towards Fondo
Location
- Location within Barcelona

Marina (Catalan pronunciation: [məˈɾinə]) is a station in the Barcelona Metro and Trambesòs tram networks, at the boundary between the Eixample and Sant Martí districts of Barcelona. It is served by TMB line L1 and tram route T4. The station is named after the nearby Carrer de la Marina, and can be accessed from Carrer dels Almogàvers, and the crossing of Carrer de la Marina with the Avinguda Meridiana. It is adapted for disabled people.

The metro station opened in 1933, as the terminus of an extension from Arc de Triomf station, and became a through station in 1951, when line L1 was extended to Clot station. When built, the station's platforms were located below the sidings of the former Estació del Nord railway station, and as a consequence they are now below the Parc de l'Estació del Nord that has replaced these sidings. Although the Estació del Nord itself has now been converted into a bus station and sports hall, these facilities are more easily accessed from Arc de Triomf metro station. The adjacent tram station opened in 2004.

== See also ==
- List of Barcelona Metro stations
- List of tram stations in Barcelona
