= Trambesòs =

Tram network in the Barcelona area

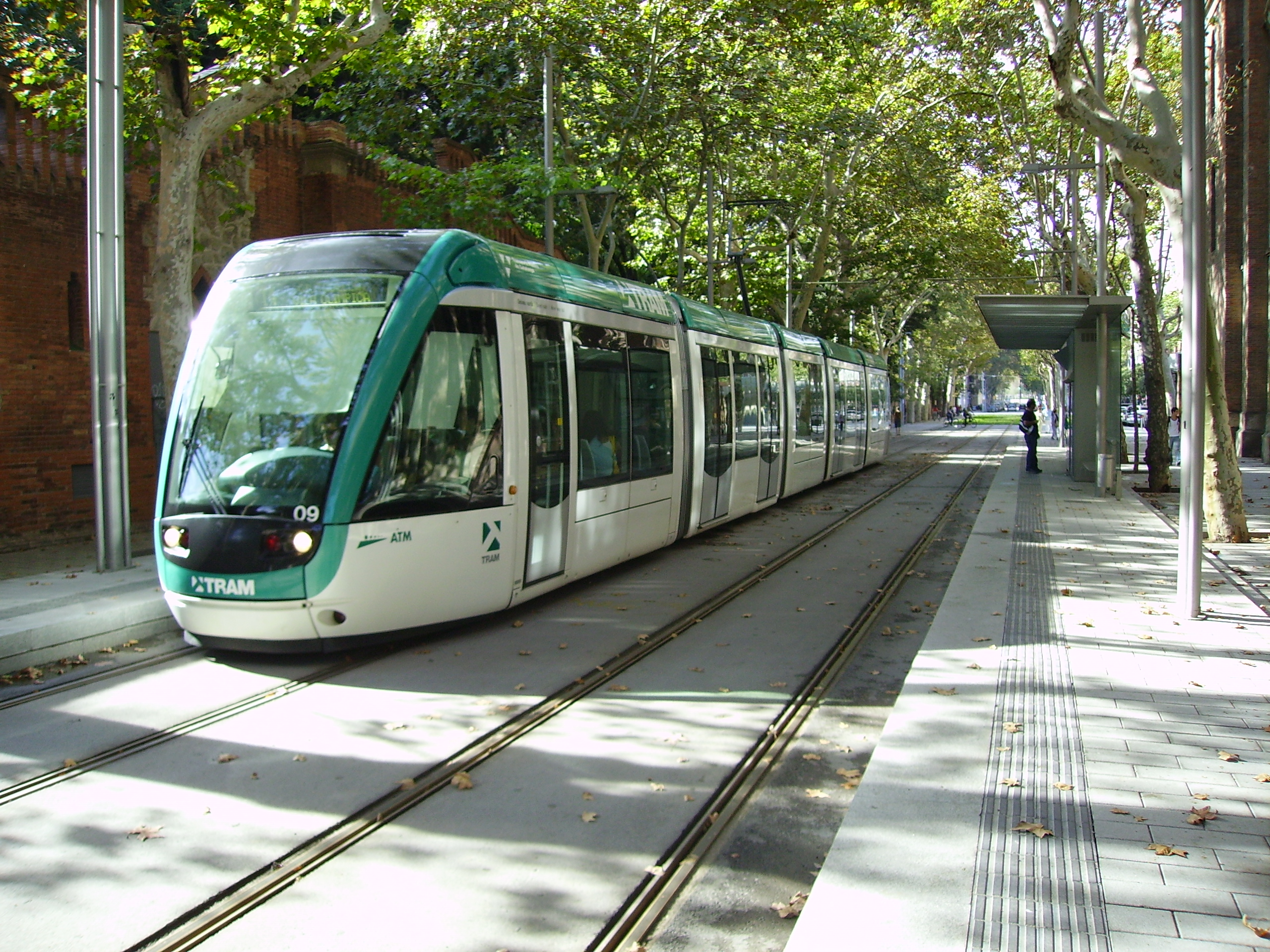
- A tram standing at Wellington stop

Overview
- Status: Operational
- Locale: Barcelona metropolitan area
- Stations: 29
- Website: www.tram.cat

Service
- Type: Tram, light rail
- Operator(s): Tramvia Metropolità del Besòs, S.A. (part of TRAM)
- Depot: Central Tèrmica del Besòs
- Rolling stock: Alstom Citadis 302, Alstom Citadis 305
- Ridership: ▲7,985,513 (2010)

History
- Opened: 8 May 2004

Technical
- Line length: 14.097 km (8.759 mi)
- Character: At-grade
- Track gauge: 1,435 mm (4 ft 8 1/2 in) standard gauge
- Electrification: Overhead line, 750 V DC
- Operating speed: 19.37 km/h (12.04 mph)

Trambesòs (Catalan pronunciation: [ˌtrambəˈzɔs]) is a tram–light rail system in the Spanish autonomous community of Catalonia that links the Barcelona district of Sant Martí with Badalona and Sant Adrià de Besòs. Its name comes from the union of the words "tram", an abbreviation of the Catalan word for "tram" (tramvia), and "Besòs", the name of an area in the north of the Barcelonès region dominated by the Besòs River.

The first section of Trambesòs was opened on 8 May 2004 as part of route T4 and since its opening it has undergone several extensions. The most recent extension opened on November 10, 2024. It was the first step to connect the network to the Trambaix along the Avinguda Diagonal, with a three station extension from Glòries to Verdaguer.

Trambesòs is operated by TRAM. It complements the Trambaix that runs to the south-west of the city. The networks are slated to be interconnected through Avinguda Diagonal in the final construction phase.

== System overview ==
The system comprises 29 stops and has a total length of 16 kilometres (9.9 mi) whereby three different routes are run. The network is configured as a double-track electrified tramline built to the standard track gauge that starts near Parc de la Ciutadella in the Barcelona district of Sant Martí and continues towards Badalona and Sant Adrià de Besòs through Gran Via de les Corts Catalanes and Avinguda Diagonal, the system's two main arterial corridors to enter Barcelona. There is also another branch that crosses the La Rambla de la Mina street in Sant Adrià and connects the Gran Via section with the Avinguda Diagonal one. The Avinguda Diagonal branch was extended to Verdaguer in November 2024, with this section featuring Alstom's ground-level power supply (APS).

Trambesòs uses exclusive infrastructure such as a reserved platform for its circulation along all its route and dedicated signaling. The exclusive use of the reserved platform by the tram is meant to provide greater regularity, speed and safety, and it only has contact with other vehicles at several existing at-grade intersections with the local street system. These intersections are regulated by traffic lights, which do not have the traffic signal preemption system fully operational, what would allow the tram to reach 20 km/h (12 mph). The reserved platform houses the tracks, the overhead contact system, the dedicated signaling and the railway platforms. In addition, it is level with the sidewalks in most of its path and is sometimes grass-covered or simply covered in concrete or asphalt concrete like the road surface. In order to supply electric power to the overhead line, six substations were built along the line, providing a voltage of 750 V DC. The contact wire has a cross-section of 150 mm^{2} (0.23 in^{2}) supported by several metallic utility poles positioned along the railway tracks.

The rolling stock operated on the network is composed of 18 Citadis 302 low-floor trams built in its variation "Barcelona" (teal and white colors) by Alstom at its manufacturing plant in Santa Perpètua de Mogoda. In addition, three Citadis 305 trams were delivered from the same factory in 2025. Tram units are parked and maintained at the only depot of Trambesòs located next to Central Tèrmica del Besòs stop, on a triangular piece of land between the Ronda Litoral coastal beltway and the Barcelona–Mataró–Maçanet-Massanes railway.

Autoritat del Transport Metropolità (ATM) is the transport authority responsible for fares and ticketing, and for marketing the network. Trambesòs is part of the integrated fare system within Barcelona metropolitan area and is entirely within ATM fare zone 1. Fares are the same as the ones applied on Trambaix as well as the ticket system. Single tickets can be purchased at stops by using ticket machines and allow you to transfer between other Trambesòs routes for 30 minutes without having to buy another ticket. All tickets or other transportation cards must be validated upon boarding by tapping them on one of the machines inside the tram. Underground tram stations used to have fare gates so there was no need to validate the ticket on the tram. The fare gates were removed in 2015.

=== Stops ===
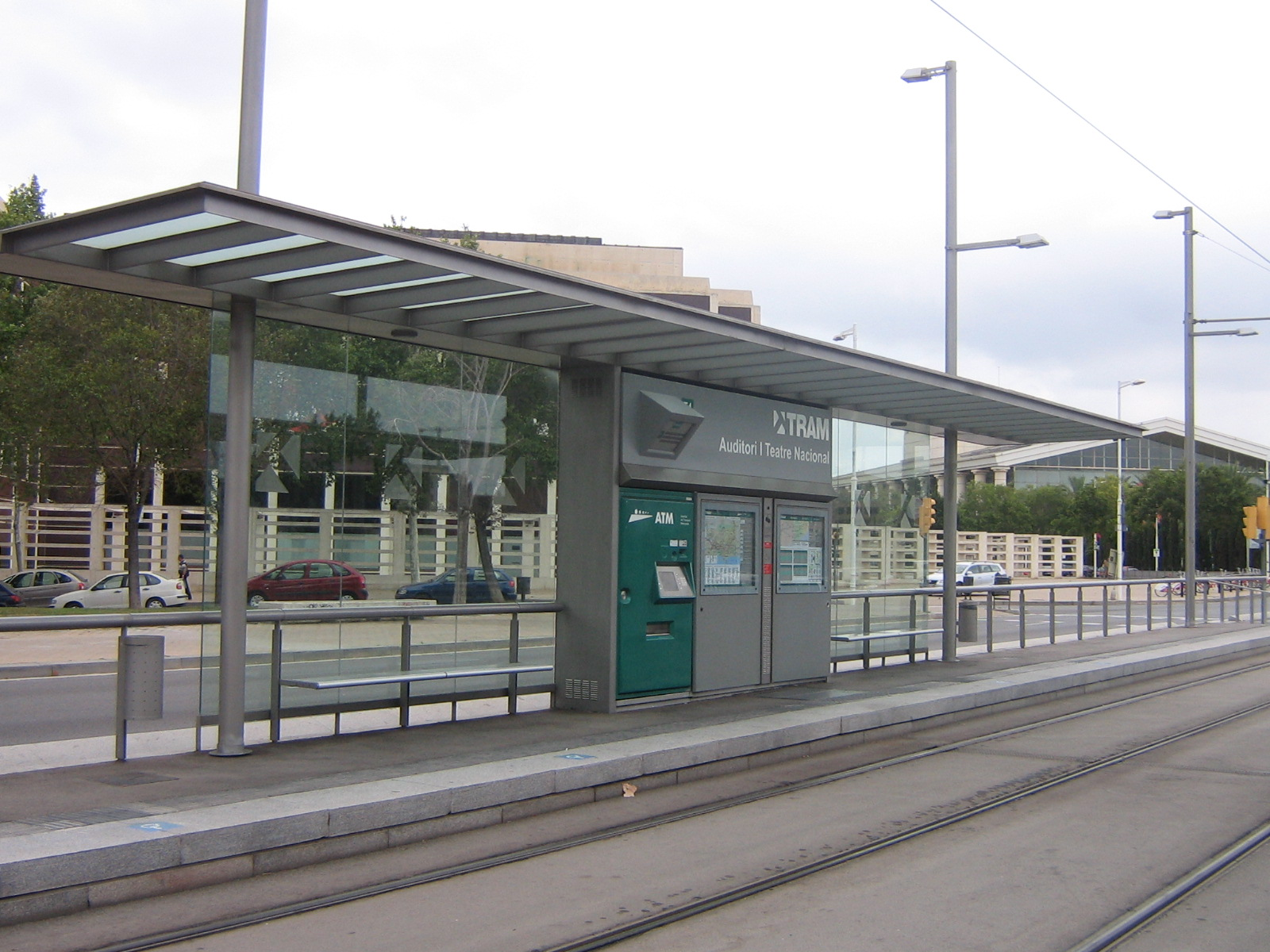
View of one of the railway platforms, the tracks and one of the shelters of Auditori – Teatre Nacional tram stop. Several facilities such as the ticket machine, two noticeboards and a passenger information display (PID) screen can be seen.

A tram at a Trambesòs stop in 2023

The system currently comprises 27 stops, each following the same design and technical characteristics as Trambaix stops. Almost all stops have 60-metre-long (200 ft) low platforms (35 centimetres or 14 inches above rail level) with a 6-metre-long (20 ft) ramp at each end of the platform. This allows wheelchairs, prams, pushchairs and the elderly to board the tram easily with no steps. The stops also have different platform layouts depending on the street section where they are located. Currently there are 8 stops with 1 island platform and 19 stops with 2 side platforms, three of which are located underground in the Gran Via section. There are also 8 stops that offer a transfer to Barcelona Metro network while only Estació de Sant Adrià stop offers a transfer to Rodalies de Catalunya commuter rail services, becoming the only stop of the whole network that offers a transfer to some kind of heavy rail services.

Design and facilities of the stops are meant to provide universal access as one of the goals of the network since its planning. The stops follow a common design that has a discrete look to them, dominated by metallic materials and panes of glass. Facilities for passengers include one or two shelters equipped with an intercom, a PA system, a passenger information display (PID), a CCTV system, a noticeboard and ticket vending machines. The shelters were designed by architects Antoni Roselló and Rafael Cáceres, who were awarded in the design section of the 2004 City of Barcelona Awards for this design.

=== Routes ===
Three east–west routes currently make up the Trambesòs system. The Gran Via section is used by both routes T5 and T6, while the Avinguda Diagonal section and the branch in the La Mina neighbourhood are only used by routes T4 and T6, respectively. All routes converge at Plaça de les Glòries Catalanes, making it the only station in the whole network that provides a transfer to all Trambesòs routes. The routes were reorganized in October 2024 to accommodate the network's expansion along Avinguda Diagonal.

Routes are generally displayed by a teal square with a white "T" followed by the route number in it (e.g. ). Trambaix routes are also displayed with a "T" to stand out those are also tram services so the difference between the two networks is on the numbering: Trambaix uses numbers 1–3, while Trambesòs uses numbers 4–6.

- Route T4 starts in Verdaguer station and follows Aviguda Diagonal towards Plaça de les Glòries Catalanes through Avinguda Meridiana. Then it continues towards Sant Adrià de Besòs railway station via Avinguda Diagonal and Avinguda d'Eduard Maristany, where it runs parallel to the sea.
- Route T5 starts in Ciutadella and terminates at Gorg metro station in Badalona via the Gran Via section.
- Route T6 runs from Ciutadella to Sant Adrià de Besòs railway station sharing the Gran Via section together with route T5 and via the branch that runs across La Mina neighbourhood in Sant Adrià. Formerly, this route had run from Sant Adrià de Besòs railway station to Gorg metro station in Badalona via La Mina branch without entering Barcelona.

Name	First service	Current service	Number of stops	Length	Journey time	Rush hour frequency	Off-peak time frequency	Map
Trambesòs	Verdaguer ↔ Estació de Sant Adrià							
Trambesòs	8 May 2004	10 November 2024	13	6,458 m 21,188 ft	22 min	every 8 min		
Trambesòs	Verdaguer · Sicília · Monumental · Glòries · Ca l'Aranyó · Pere IV · Fluvià · Selva de Mar · El Maresme · Fòrum · Campus Diagonal-Besòs · Port Fòrum · Estació de Sant Adrià							
Trambesòs	Ciutadella | Vila Olímpica ↔ Gorg							
Trambesòs	14 October 2006	21 October 2024	16	6,993 m 22,943 ft	22 min	every 16 min		
Trambesòs	Ciutadella | Vila Olímpica · Wellington · Marina · Auditori | Teatre Nacional · Glòries · Can Jaumandreu · Espronceda · Sant Martí de Provençals · Besòs · Alfons el Magnànim · Parc del Besòs · La Catalana · Sant Joan Baptista · Encants de Sant Adrià · Sant Roc · Gorg							
Trambesòs	Ciutadella | Vila Olímpica ↔ Estació de Sant Adrià							—
Trambesòs	16 June 2008	21 October 2024	14	4,485 m 14,715 ft	20 min	every 16 min		—
Trambesòs	Ciutadella | Vila Olímpica · Wellington · Marina · Auditori | Teatre Nacional · Glòries · Can Jaumandreu · Espronceda · Sant Martí de Provençals · Besòs · Alfons el Magnànim · Parc del Besòs · La Mina · Port Fòrum · Estació de Sant Adrià							—

== Future developments ==
=== Linkage with Trambaix ===
The original project about the introduction of a modern tram system in Barcelona comprised the creation of a new tram route covering the whole Avinguda Diagonal, between Zona Universitària and Diagonal Mar shopping mall. With the opening of Trambaix and Trambesòs, the possibility of creating a new tram line through Avinguda Diagonal connecting both networks became more popular, and even saw a demonstration in favour of the union of the two tram networks in late September 2005. That same year, and after the announcement by the Generalitat of Catalonia to study the project, the Barcelona City Council announced its opposition, even after the publication of two studies that positively assessed the linkage through Diagonal.

In 2008, the Mayor of Barcelona Jordi Hereu announced the refurbishment of Avinguda Diagonal, which included the construction of the new tram line. The creation of a new office to carry out the "Diagonal Project" was also announced and because of opposition demand, a referendum would be held among other actions to enhance citizen participation, the first referendum proclaimed by the City Council ever to be held in Barcelona. During the participatory and technical process involved in the refurbishment of Avinguda Diagonal throughout 2009, various questions and suggestions were raised to the City Council, and many of the points of the reform such as the construction of the new tram line were called into question. The referendum was officially announced in December and was planned to be held on 10–16 May 2010 with two projects to be chosen and an option to dismiss them. The voting process would take place at several municipal offices used as polling places by voting using touchscreens, though it was also possible to vote through the Internet. Citizens were asked about how they would prefer to reform the avenue, and if they would prefer to convert it into a boulevard or an avenue of a pedestrian walkway nature. The development of the referendum was marked by fierce controversy from day one, and specially because of continuous technical faults involving the electronic voting system. The winning option was finally the "C" one, dismissing all of the projects with almost 80% of votes counted. After the failed referendum, there was a political crisis of the Barcelona City Council which resulted with the resignation of two politicians from the local government team, and the linking of the two tram networks appeared to have stagnated.

The succeeding local government, headed by Xavier Trias in 2011, dismissed the proposal of connecting Trambaix and Trambesòs through Avinguda Diagonal, though it has been agreed to reactivate the linkage project with the Generalitat. Trias stated he was committed to connecting the two tram systems through different streets in the district of Eixample and objects to the construction of a tram line through Diagonal. One of the new proposed routes would mostly pass through Provença Street, creating a sort of "shuttle tram" for tourists between Sagrada Família and La Pedrera, while the other one would mostly pass through Gran Via. However, this was never realised, with Trambaix and Trambesòs remaining unconnected upon the departure of Trias' government in 2015.

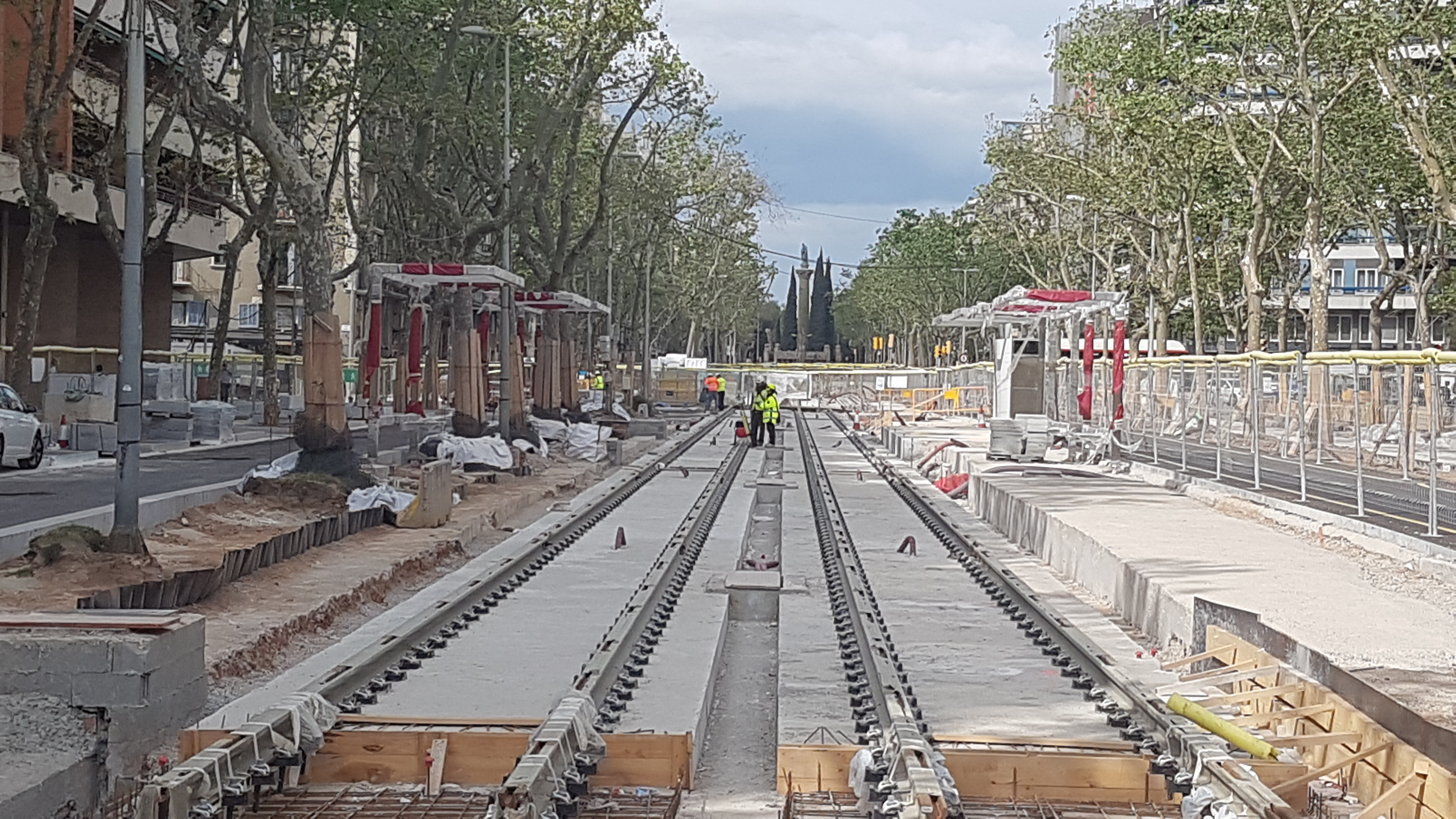
Construction works at future Sicília station in Avinguda Diagonal in 2023

Mayor Ada Colau continued promoting the connection of the TRAM along the Avinguda Diagonal, however was defeated by opposition parties when she presented the proposal to the city council in 2018. The first part of the connection was finally passed in December 2020, with the first section reaching Verdaguer (from Glòries) being opened in November 2024.

Incumbent mayor Jaume Collboni was initially hesitant about the final swift connection, voicing his concerns with the current L8 extension works at Plaça de Francesc Macià, Avinguda Diagonal, with Catalan Minister of Territory Ester Capella coming out denying any sort of incompatibility. Later, Collboni vowed to start the final connection of the tram lines only if the City's and Catalan budgets were passed. On 13 November, 3 days after the public opening of the new tram extension from Glòries to Verdaguer it was reported that Mayor Collboni planned to split the final 2 km in two stages: the first up to Passeig de Gràcia (1 station) and the second to Francesc Macià (3 remaining stations), with the City Council government focusing "in the first stage for now" and "not the latter". Before the splitting was announced, works for the whole final 2 km were expected to finish in 2028.

Line map with the Trambaix connection and other expansions

=== Other projects ===
The Infrastructure Master Plan (PDI) 2011–2020 by the Autoritat del Transport Metropolità (ATM) for Barcelona metropolitan area includes various proposals to extend the existing tram network. In general, it is about extension projects on existing routes following major arterial corridors and with a completion of projects beyond 2020.

- Estació de Sant Adrià ↔ Port de Badalona: The expansion of route T4 from Sant Adrià de Besòs railway station towards Badalona will comprise the construction of 3 new stops, 1.7 km of tracks along Eduard Maristany Avenue and the purchase of a new tramcar. It is meant to serve Badalona's coastal strip and gain more than 3,000 new passengers, 270 of which from the private car. That new section has an estimated cost of €22 million and is expected to be further extended to reach Badalona railway station in a future.
- Ciutadella | Vila Olímpica ↔ World Trade Center: It is expected to give continuity to the current southern terminus of route T4 situated at Ciutadella – Vila Olímpica stop with that extension project. The new suggested route would surround Parc de la Ciutadella passing through the nearest side to the sea, and then it would follow Barcelona's coastal strip up to the waterfront where World Trade Center Barcelona is located, serving the Port Vell area included in the Barcelona Seaport complex.
- Auditori | Teatre Nacional ↔ Plaça Urquinaona: Proposed extension of route T5 towards Barcelona city centre which branches off the Trambesòs network near today's Auditori – Teatre Nacional tram stop and passes through the arterial corridors of Avinguda Vilanova and Ronda de Sant Pere up to Plaça Urquinaona.
- Torribera ↔ Sant Adrià: Although this project does not appear in the updated PDI 2011–2020, it has been proposed by the Santa Coloma de Gramenet City Council and appeared in PDI 2010–2018 which was drawn up by the former government of Generalitat de Catalunya and the ATM. The project would involve the construction of a new tram line connected to the Trambesòs network, built as an extension of route T6. This new tram line would run parallel to the arterial corridor that is formed by the drainage basin of river Besòs, linking the municipality of Sant Adrià de Besòs to Santa Coloma de Gramenet up to Torribera Center, a Diputació de Barcelona-owned building used by the University of Barcelona located in the northern part of town.

== Vandalism ==
Trambesòs is one of the public transport networks in Barcelona metropolitan area with one of the highest rates of fraud, incivility and vandalism This results in €275,000 per year in added expenses for TRAM. It is estimated that one in three Trambesòs users travel without paying, being the final section of routes T5 and T6 where more cases involving fraud in the ticket payment are reported, and whereby even incidents with ticket inspectors are also reported, sometimes involving the intervention by the police force. Attacks on tram drivers have also been reported of which one of the most controversial was when a group of 15 people were waiting at Gorg stop in Badalona at 1:00 am for the arrival of the tram to lynch the driver, who tried to shut himself inside the driving cab, being unable to avoid punches. After this controversial aggression, TRAM decided to strengthen security on the network, mainly at Gorg, Estació de Sant Adrià and Ciutadella – Vila Olímpica stops. It was also decided to rely on popular mediators who are natives from the affected area and selected by the Federation of Gypsy Associations in Catalonia (Fagic) to minimize vandalism, making possible to solve several conflicts.

== See also ==
- Trams in Barcelona
- Autoritat del Transport Metropolità
- TRAM (company)
- Trambaix
- Transport in Barcelona
- Tramvia Blau
