= Plaça de les Glòries Catalanes =

Square in Barcelona, Spain

Coordinates: 41°24′12″N 2°11′13″E

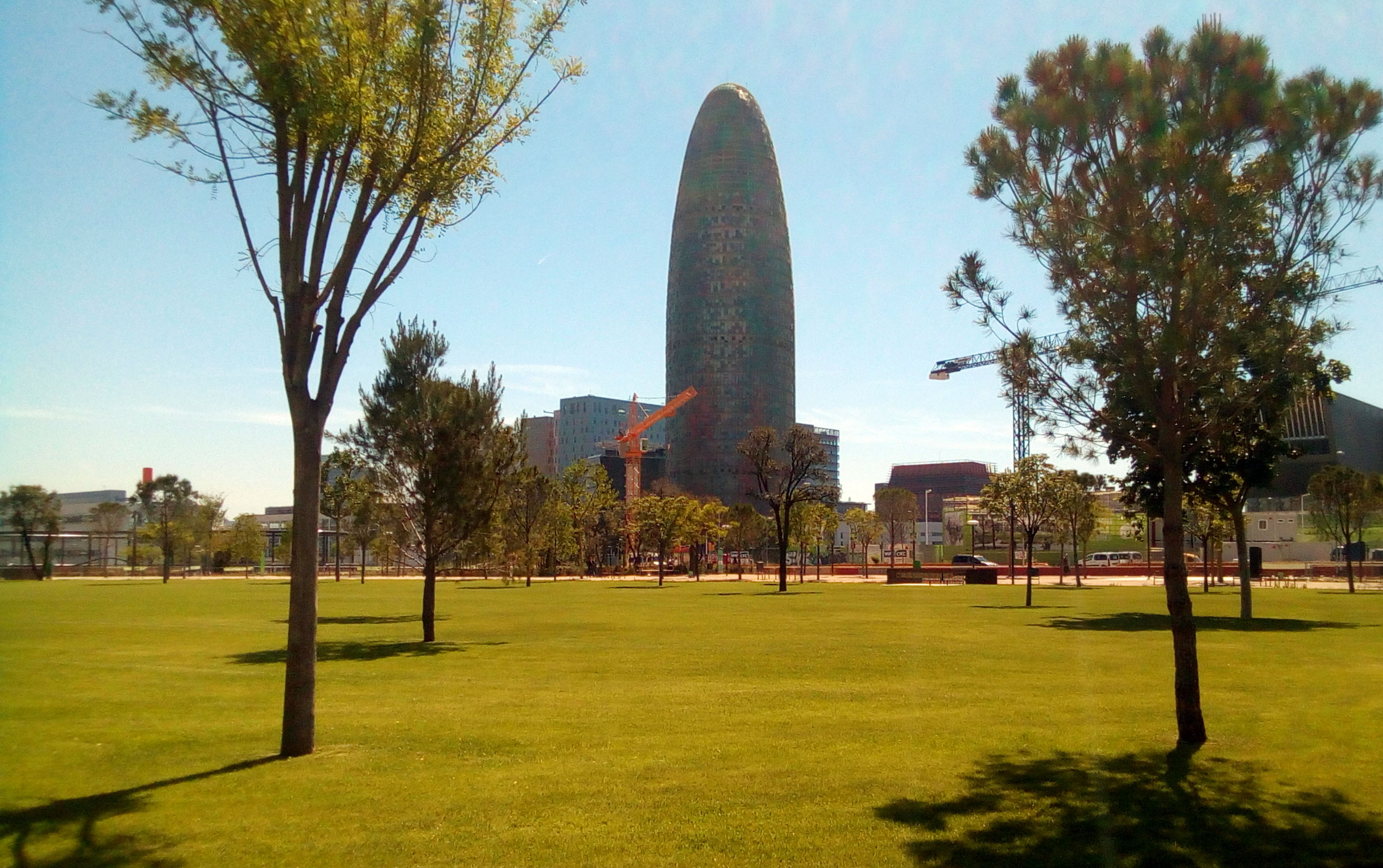
Gloriès park as of 2019.

Plaça de les Glòries Catalanes (Catalan pronunciation: [ˈplasə ðə ləz ˈɣlɔɾiəs kətəˈlanəs]), (Spanish: Plaza de las Glorias Catalanas; both meaning "Catalan Glories Square") most often shortened to Glòries, is a large square in Barcelona, first designed by Ildefons Cerdà to serve as the city centre in his original urban plan (Pla Cerdà), but nowadays relegated to quite a secondary position. It is located in the Sant Martí district, bordering Eixample, at the junction of three of the city's most important thoroughfares: Avinguda Diagonal, Avinguda Meridiana and Gran Via de les Corts Catalanes.

For decades, its main purpose was to function as a roundabout of elevated highways. However, in the early 2000s, a revamping project for Glòries started, which aimed to give the square a new role in Barcelona and revitalize the northern districts of the city, under the name 22@. These plans supplement other large-scale plans in Sagrera and the Fòrum area. The first installment of this project was the construction of the Torre Agbar skyscraper.

== History ==
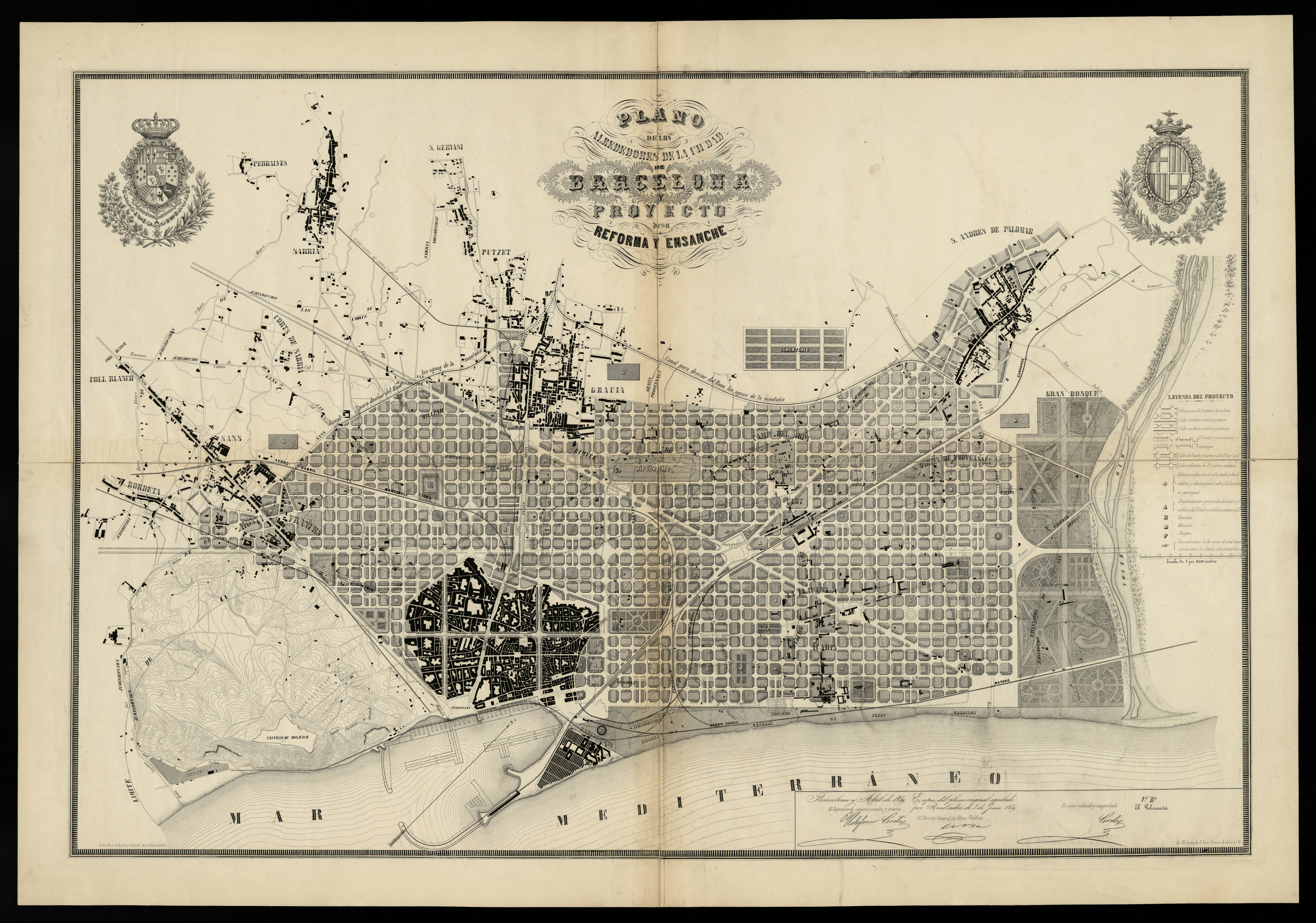
The Cerdà plan, c. 1850. Plaça de les Glòries is the large square in the centre.

Plaça de les Glòries, which was then well outside the city, was originally featured in the mid-19th-century Cerdà plan for Barcelona, intended as a large public square in a new city centre, but it remained sparsely developed, turning into one of Barcelona's major road and railway junctions. Eventually the railways were closed or went underground, and around 1990 the road junction was reshaped into a large elevated roundabout with a park at its centre, with pedestrian access beneath the roads.

=== Els Encants ===
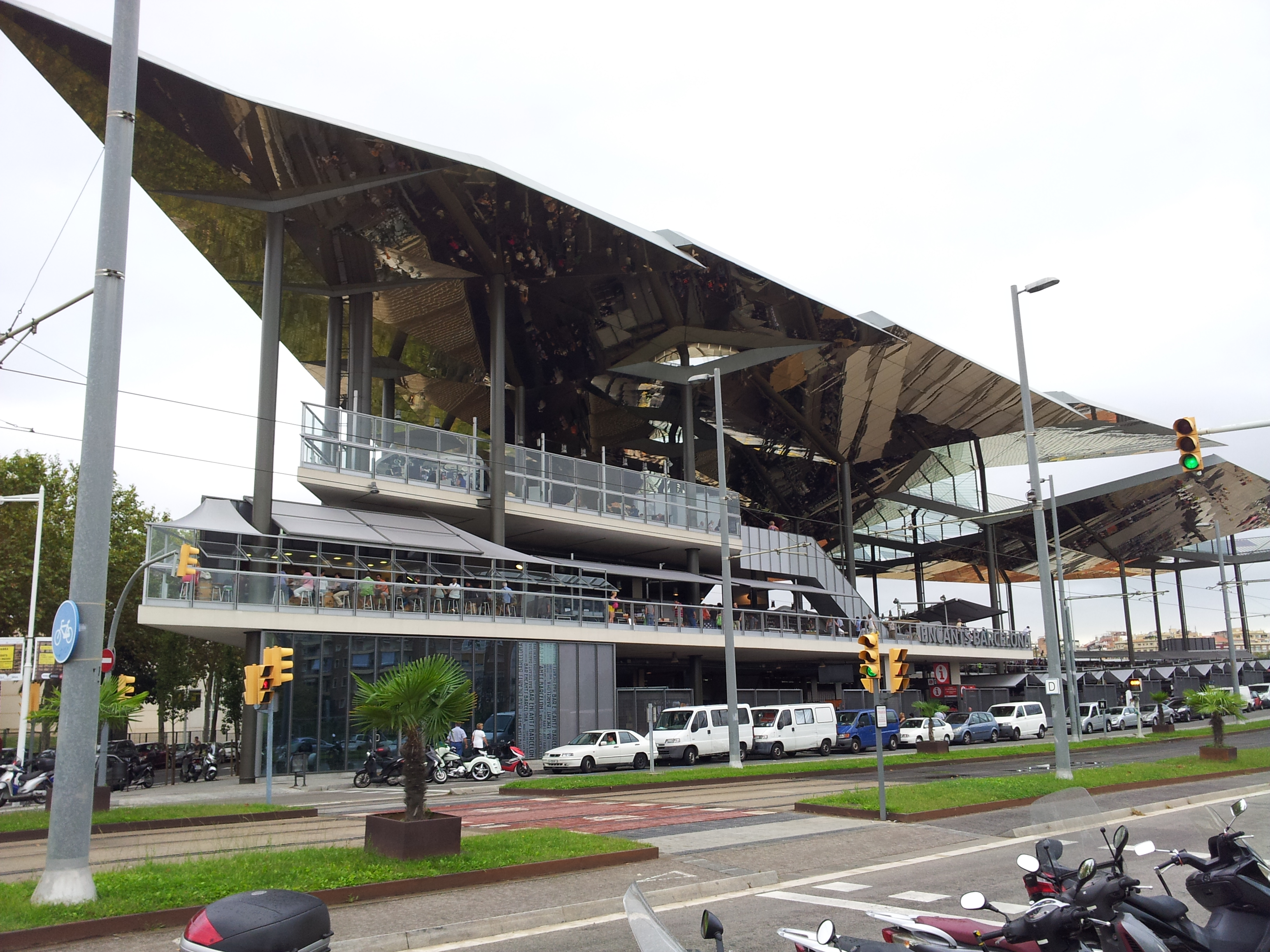
The new Encants market

Since 1928, Glòries has been the location of one of Europe's oldest open-air flea markets, known as els Encants Vells or Fira de Bellcaire, which is said to date back to the 14th century, and operates four days a week. The market was formerly housed on an area of land at the north-western side of the square, but as part of the redevelopment of the area a new development has been built at a site at the south-western end of the square, consisting of a multi-level construction to provide covered walkways, modern facilities for the traders, and parking for customers.

== Redevelopment ==
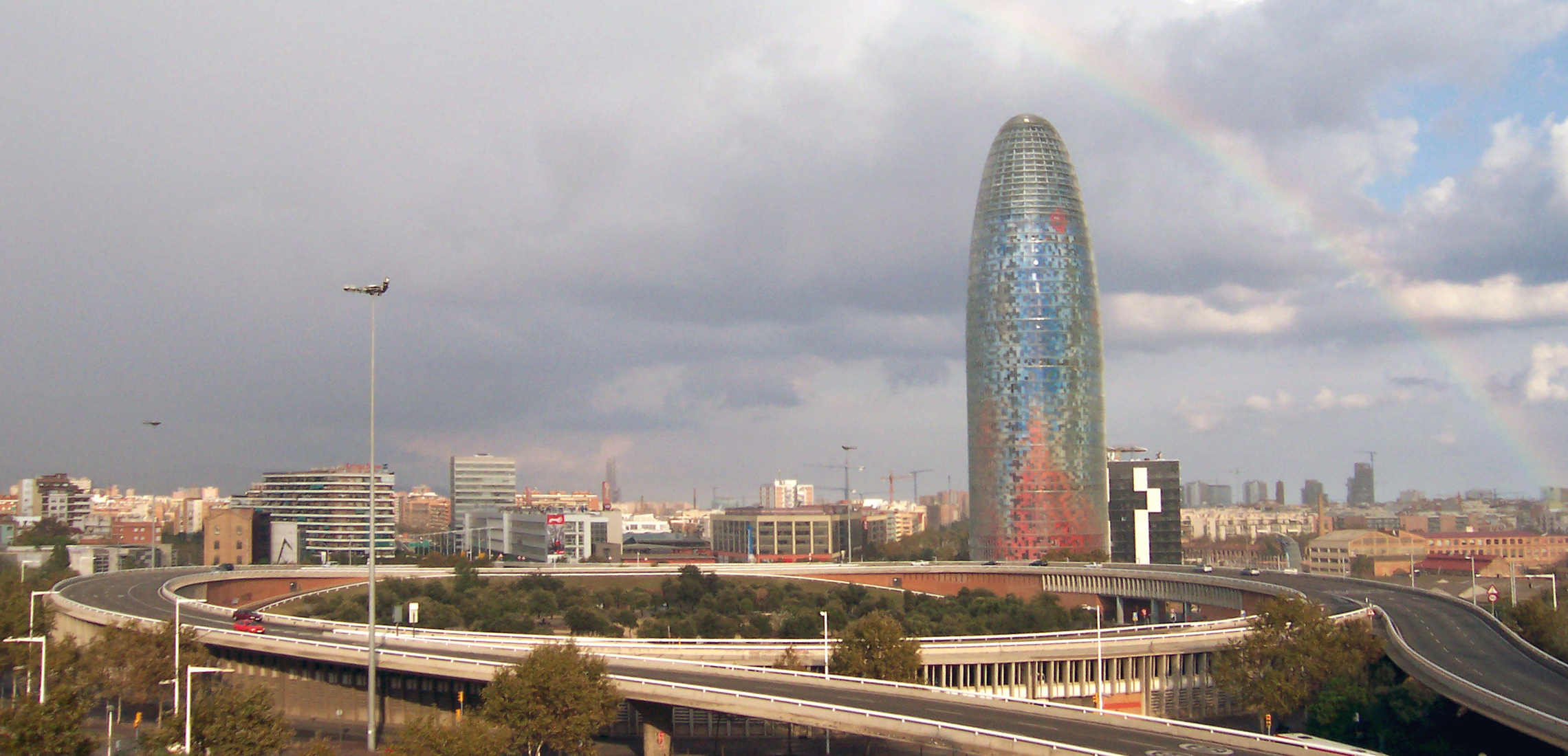
Glòries in 2005, before reconstruction

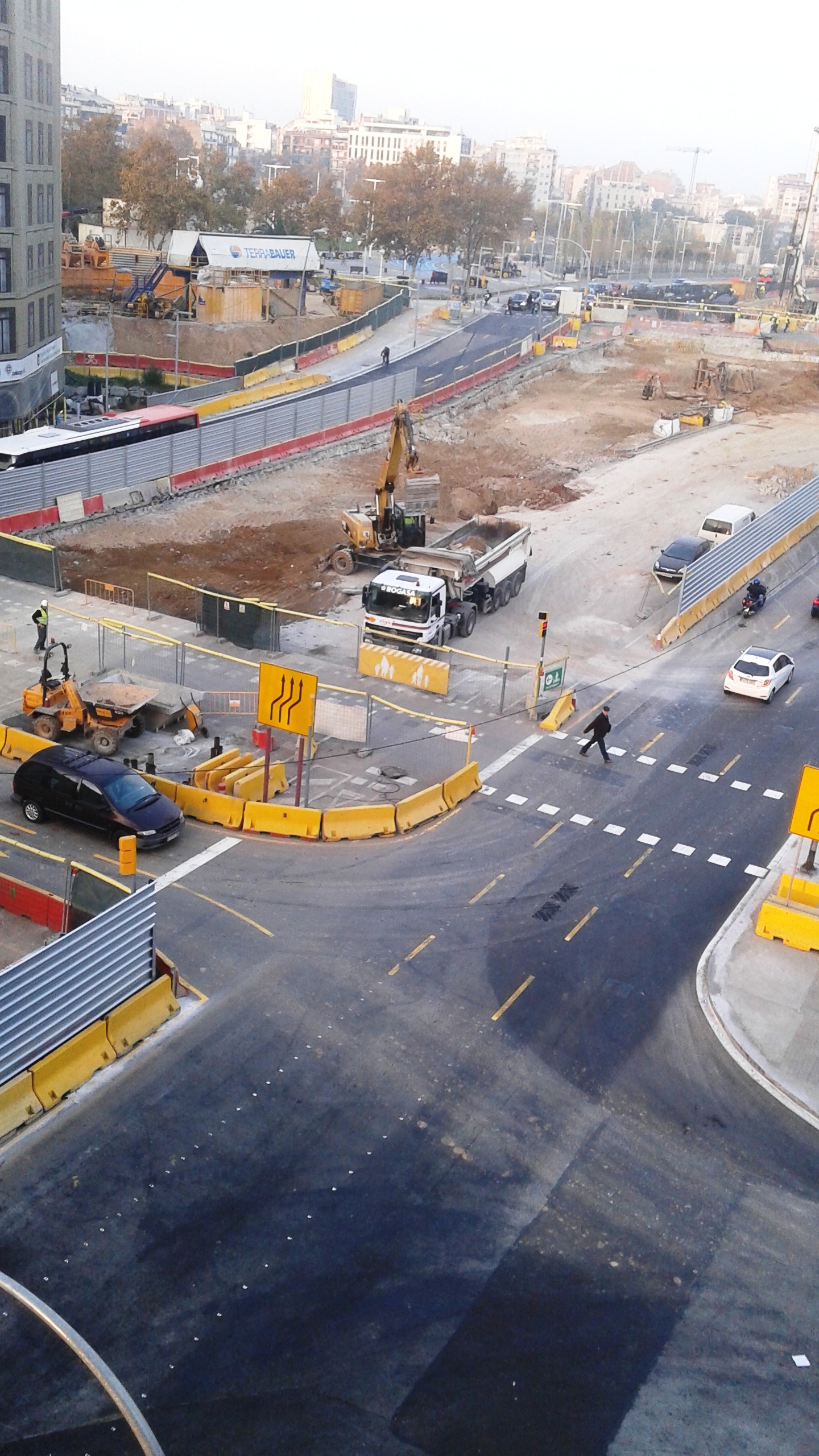
During reconstruction

Large portions of the square were occupied by parking lots and its central area is surrounded by concrete walls, part of the not very aesthetic elevated highways. The rest of the square hosts a shopping centre (the Centre Comercial Glòries), a secondary school (IES Salvador Espriu), and the Torre Agbar.

Glòries and its immediate area were redeveloped to become a park with a multitude of services including a public library, a major underground train station (served by Renfe and Ferrocarrils de la Generalitat de Catalunya), a public clinic, a sports centre as well as a museum of design. Integration with other buildings already completed in the area (Teatre Nacional de Catalunya, L'Auditori and Mercat dels Encants) was a key component of proposed redevelopment.

Furthermore, the three major thoroughfares that cross Glòries were partially laid underground to make room for open green space.

In March 2016, ongoing excavations as part of the area's redevelopment uncovered extensive remains of el Rec Comtal, an important aqueduct possibly dating back to Roman times, which until the mid-20th century brought water from the Besòs river to the city.

In spring 2025, an ornamental granite surface covered by water (Mirall d’Aigua, "Water Mirror") was inaugurated. It was projected, however, as a surface with occasional water jets for children's play. Anyway, children and families used it as a shallow pool to play and counter the summer heat. It was left dry in July as the city feared that unsanctioned use could lead to accidents and infections from recirculated water.

== Buildings and structures ==
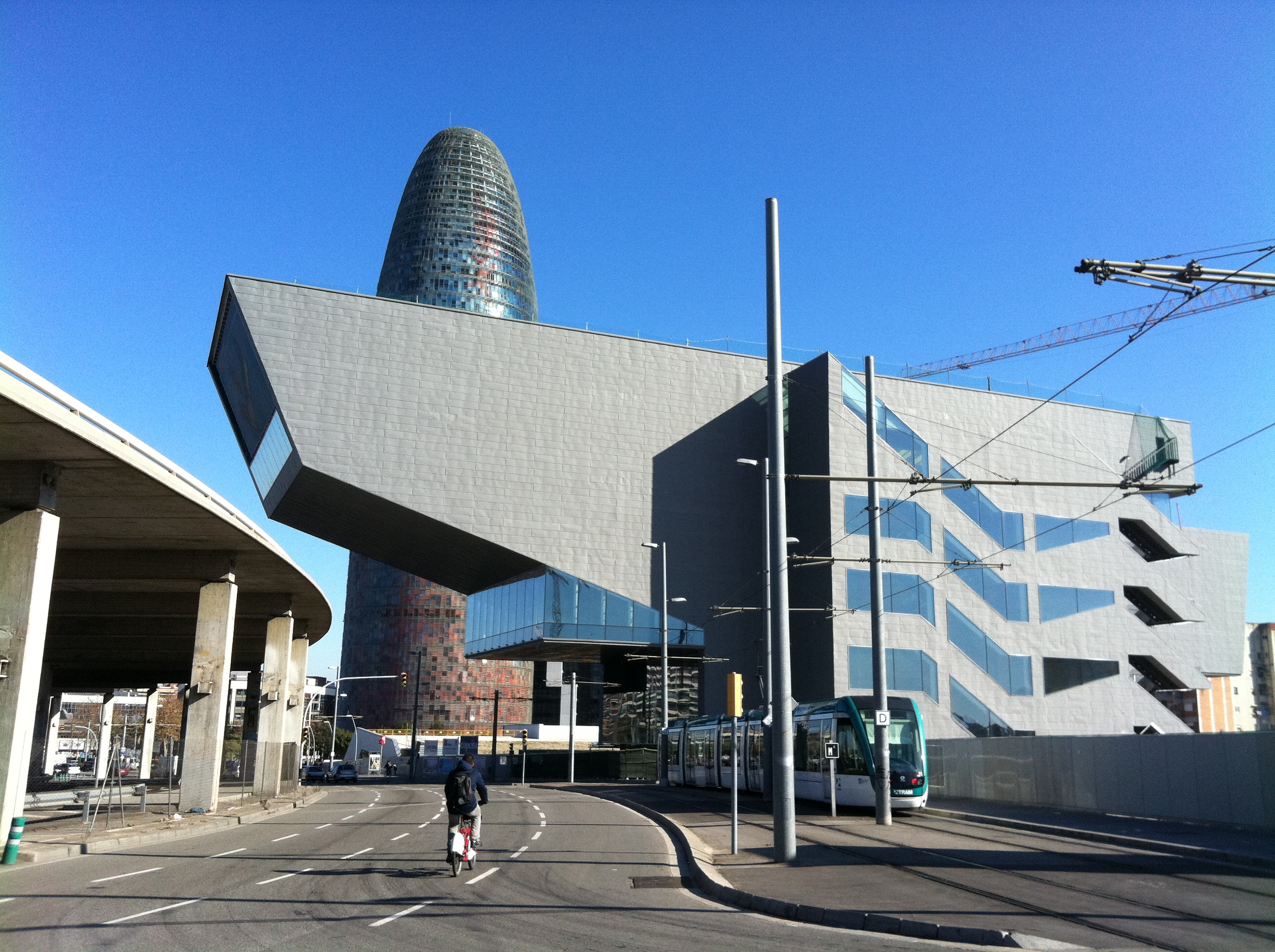
Disseny Hub Barcelona, by MBM.

=== Completed ===
- Torre Agbar by Jean Nouvel
- La Farinera del Clot, a cultural centre. The building, a former factory, was recently rebuilt.
- Disseny Hub Barcelona

=== In progress ===
- Complex de Cinemes-Plaça de les Arts, by Zaha Hadid
- Edifici Ona, and administrative building for the city council.
- Statue of Freddie Mercury and Montserrat Caballé, performers of the song “Barcelona” that served as the theme for the 1992 Summer Olympics

== Transportation ==
=== Metro ===
- Glòries (L1)

=== Tram ===
- Glòries (Trambesòs routes T4 and T5)
- La Farinera (Trambesòs route T5)

==== In progress ====
- The union of the Trambaix and Trambesòs networks by Avinguda Diagonal

=== Bus ===
- Line 7 Diagonal Mar - Zona Universitària
- Line 56 Collblanc - Besòs/Verneda
- Line 60 Pl. Glòries - Zona Universitària
- Line 92 Pg. Marítim - Gràcia
- Line B21 Barcelona (Rda. St. Pere) - Sta. Coloma (Av. Ramon Berenguer IV)
- Line 192 Hospital de Sant Pau - Poblenou

=== Night Bus ===
- N0 Pl. Portal de la Pau - Pl. Portal de la Pau
- N2 Hospitalet (Av. Carrilet) - Badalona (Via Augusta)
- N7 Pl. Pedralbes - Pl. Llevant (Fòrum)

=== Biking ===
- Avinguda Diagonal

== Transport projects ==
A new large station joining the different rail systems of Barcelona has been proposed, but is still under consideration.

- A controversial FGC rail and metro station planned by the Barcelona city council but still not approved by Generalitat de Catalunya.
- A Renfe train station which will probably replace Arc de Triomf train station. It will be served by R1, R3 and R4 Rodalies lines.

== Culture ==
- Centre Cultural la Farinera del Clot, a theatre.
- Versus Teatre

=== Events ===
- Barcelona Visual Sound, a multimedia festival held in February in different parts of the city, hosts in Glòries its most important acts.

== Hotels ==
- Hotel Diagonal Barcelona
- Hotel Glories, Padilla 173 - 08013 Barcelona

== See also ==
- Poblenou
- List of streets and squares in Eixample
- Glòries metro station
- Street names in Barcelona
- Urban planning of Barcelona
