= Glòries station =

Metro station in Barcelona, Spain

Glòries
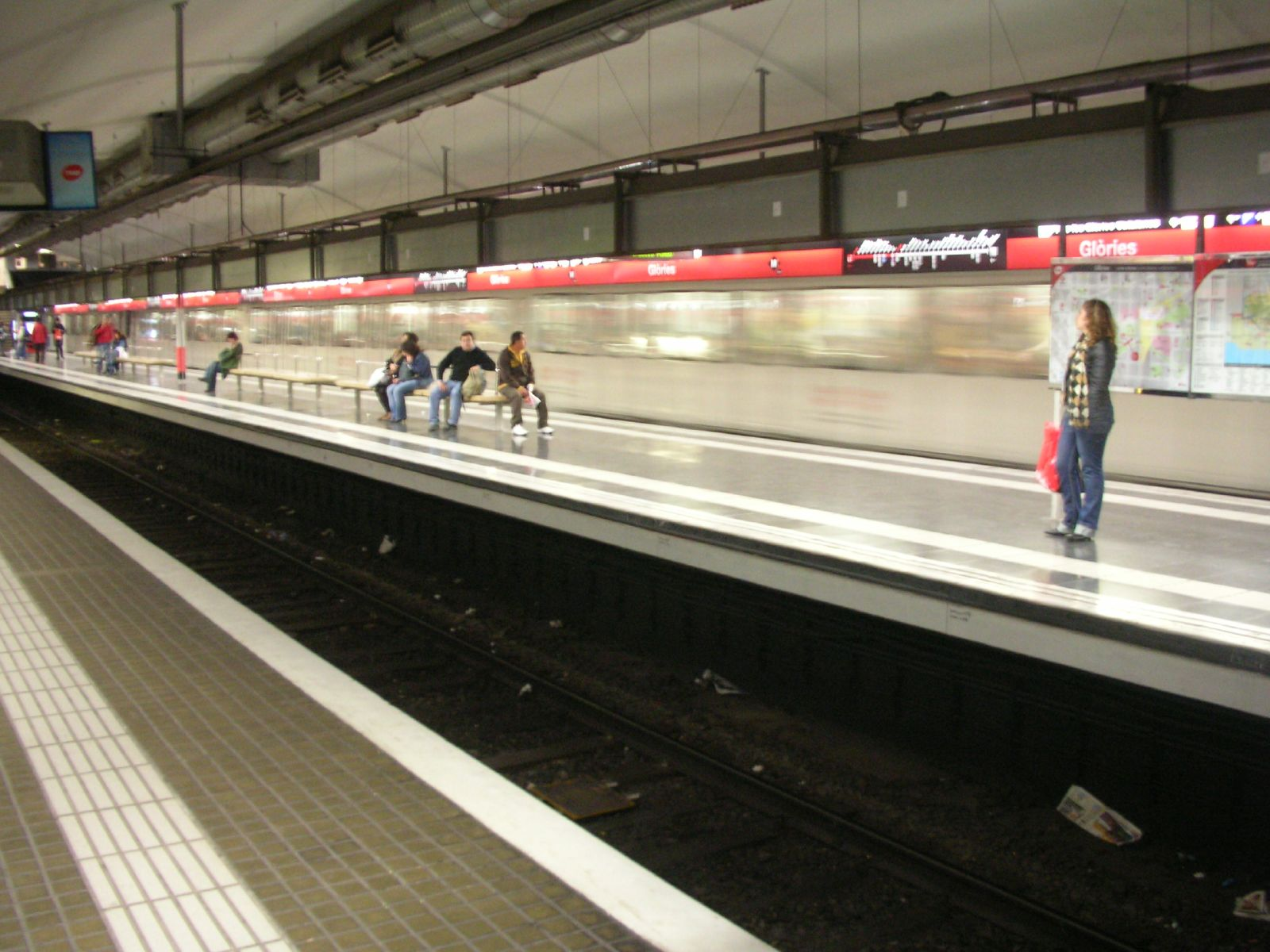
- Glòries metro platforms

General information
- Location: Barcelona (Eixample/Sant Martí)
- Coordinates: 41°24′12″N 2°11′13″E
- System: Barcelona Metro rapid transit station Trambesòs tram stop
- Operator: Transports Metropolitans de Barcelona; TramMet

Other information
- Fare zone: 1 (ATM)

History
- Opened: 1951 (as a metro station); 2004 (as a tram station)

Services
Preceding station	Metro	Following station
Marina towards Hospital de Bellvitge	L1	Clot towards Fondo
Location
- Location within Barcelona

Glòries (Catalan pronunciation: [ˈɡlɔɾi.əs]) is a station in the Barcelona Metro network, at the boundary between the Eixample and Sant Martí districts of Barcelona. It is served by TMB line L1. The station is named after the nearby Plaça de les Glòries Catalanes.

It was opened in 1951, when Line 1 was extended from Marina to Clot. It can be accessed from Carrer d'Àlaba and Glòries. It is fully accessible for disabled people.

Glòries is also an important Tram station, serving all three of the Trambesòs tram routes (T4, T5 and T6). Initially located next to the Encants Nous market, the tram station was relocated to a more central location on Glòries Square in 2024, in front of the Design Museum of Barcelona. The tram station features 3 platforms, allowing easy connection between the different routes and service to the new extension along the Avinguda Diagonal. A new metro access was also opened next to the tram platforms in 2024.

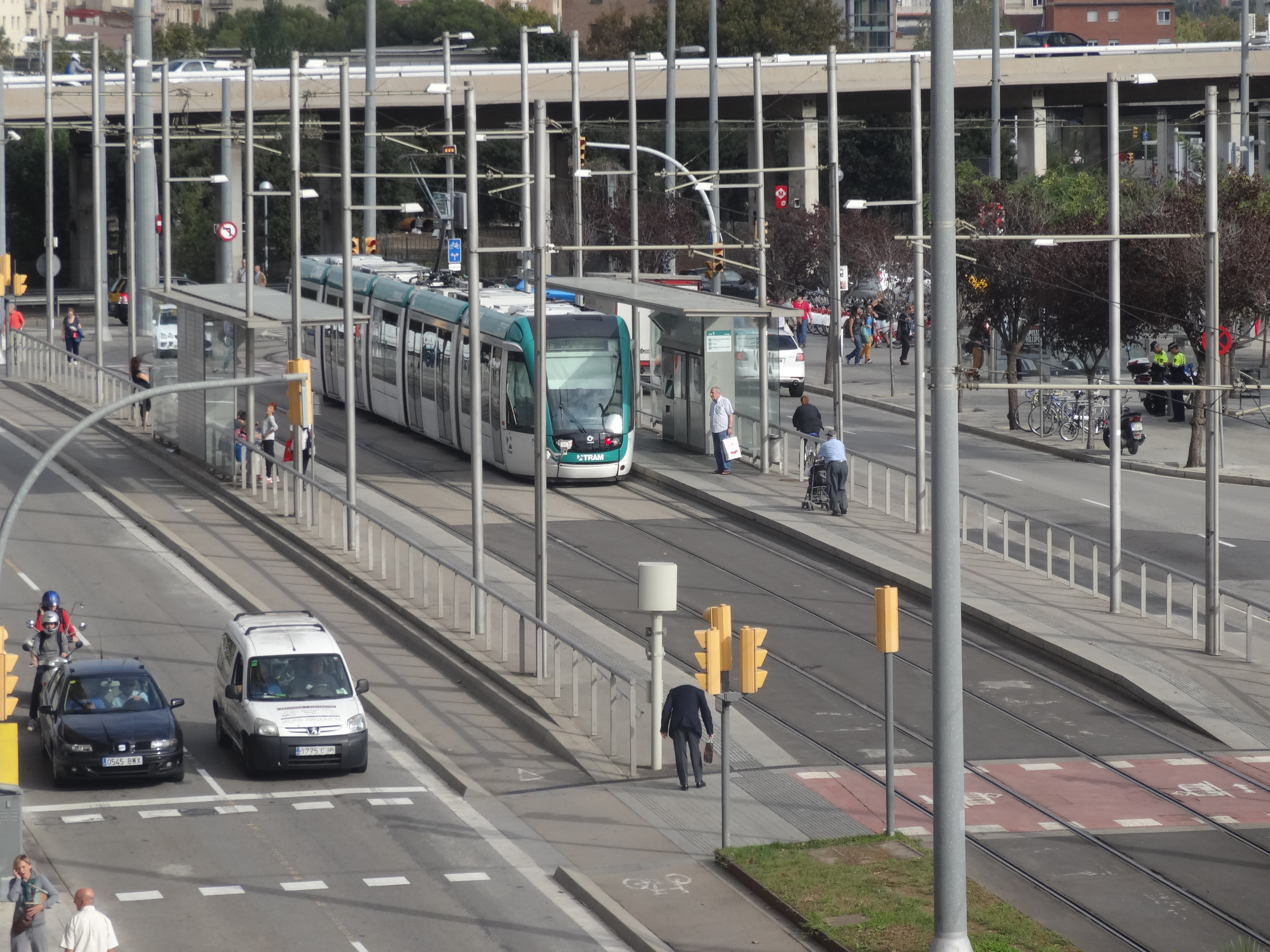
The former Glòries tram stop with metro entrance in the background

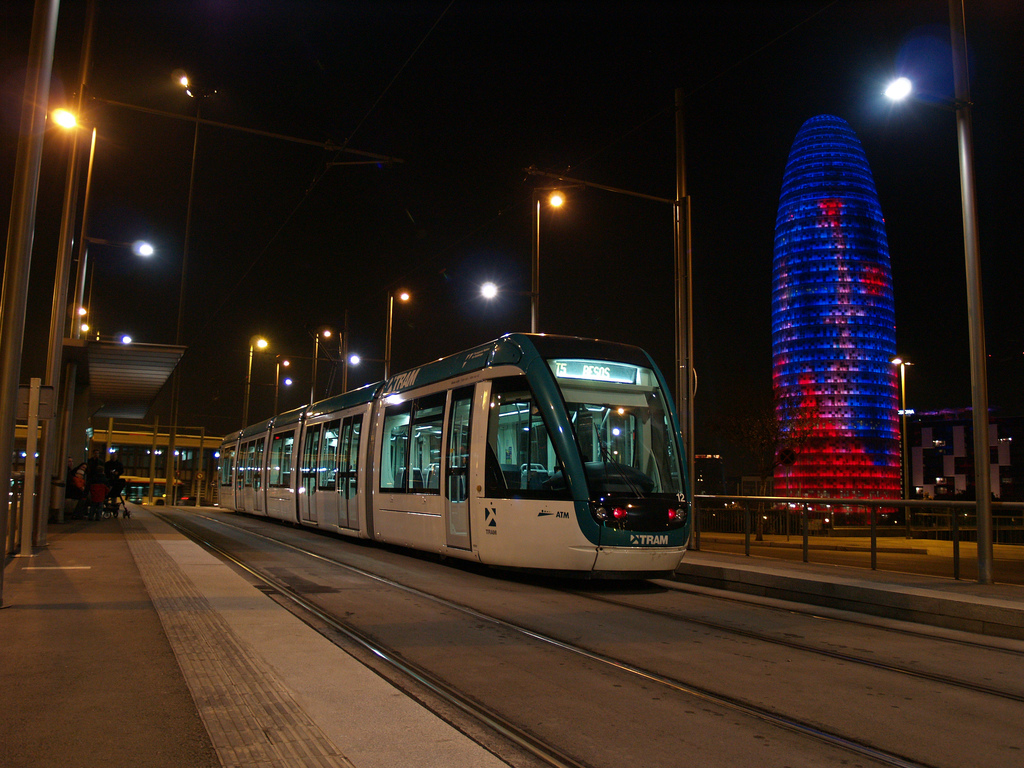
The former tram stop at night

== See also ==
- Plaça de les Glòries Catalanes
- List of Barcelona Metro stations
- List of tram stations in Barcelona
