= Ciutadella/Vila Olímpica station =

Metro station in Barcelona, Spain

Ciutadella | Vila Olímpica
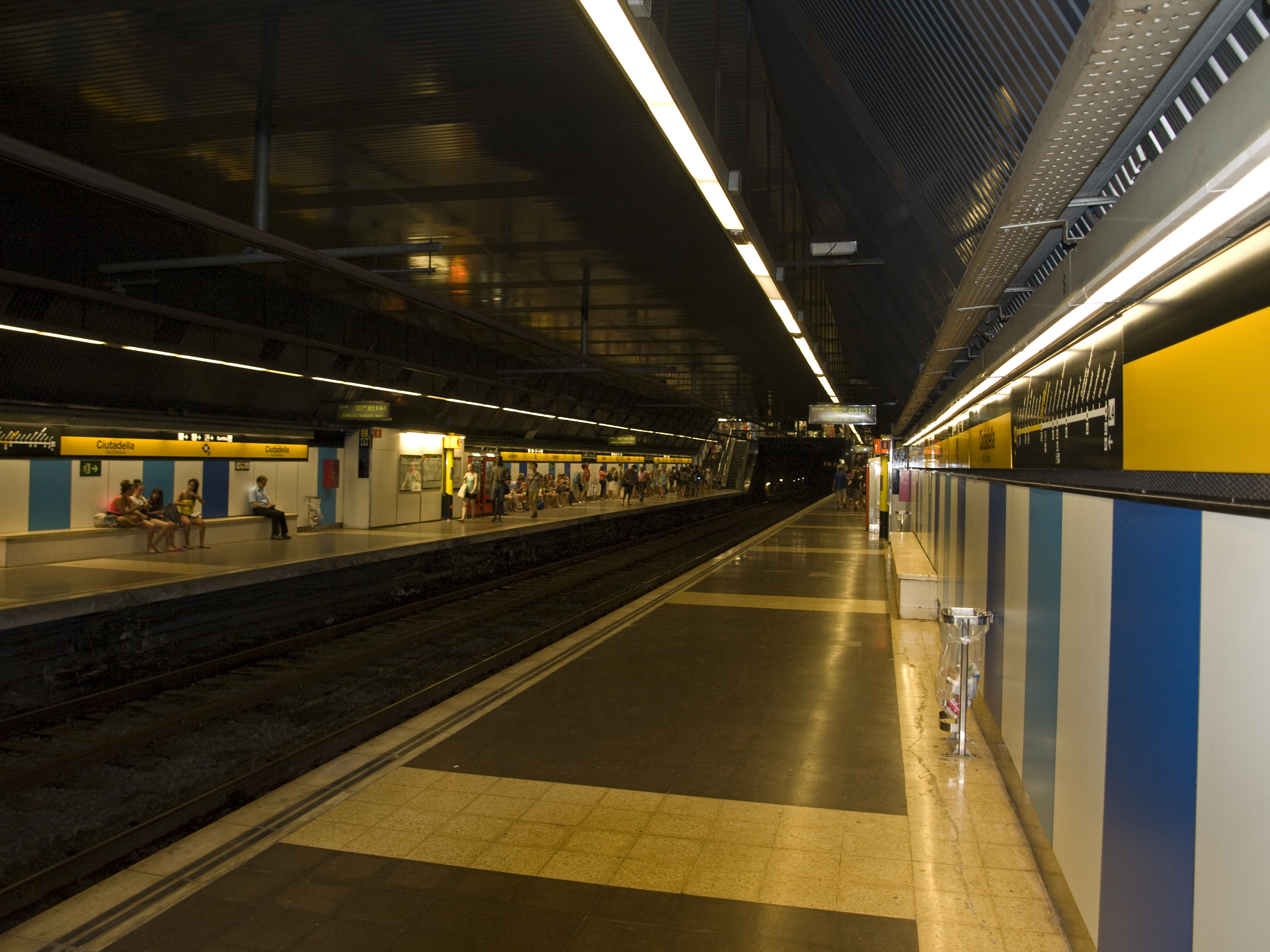
- The platforms

General information
- Location: Sant Martí, Barcelona; Spain
- Coordinates: 41°23′16.78″N 2°11′35.88″E
- Line: L4 (Barcelona Metro)
- Connections: Trambesòs T4

Construction
- Structure type: Underground

History
- Opened: 1977
- Closed: 1991–1992
- Rebuilt: 2007
Location

Ciutadella | Vila Olímpica (Catalan pronunciation: [siwtəˈðeʎə ˈβilə uˈlimpikə]) is a station of the Barcelona Metro and Trambesòs in the Sant Martí district of Barcelona. It's named after one of Barcelona's major parks, Parc de la Ciutadella, and La Vila Olímpica del Poblenou, a neighbourhood in the immediate vicinities. It's served by L4 (yellow line), and tram route T4, of which it is a terminus. It was built in 1977 (49 years ago) under Parc de Carles I. It was closed between 1991 and 1992 because of infrastructure improvement with the occasion of the 1992 Olympic Games, and again in 2007 due to improvement of L4.

Within two blocks stands the Ciutadella campus of Pompeu Fabra University and the station is often crowded with university students. In summer it's also common to spot tourists heading to the Barceloneta beach. The adjacent metro stations are Barceloneta and Bogatell.

Before 1982, it was known as Ribera (named after the neighbourhood), and from then to 1992, simply as Ciutadella.

== Services ==
Preceding station	Metro	Following station
Barceloneta towards Trinitat Nova	L4	Bogatell towards La Pau

== See also ==
- Parc de la Ciutadella
- La Vila Olímpica del Poblenou
