= Verdaguer =

Verdaguer is a Catalan surname. Notable people with the surname include:

- Diego Verdaguer, Argentine singer-songwriter
- Dionisio Baixeras Verdaguer (1862–1943), Spanish painter
- Jacint Verdaguer (1845–1902), Catalan writer

== See also ==
- Verdaguer, Barcelona metro station
- Pic Verdaguer, mountain of Catalonia
- 38671 Verdaguer, main-belt asteroid
- Verdaguer House-Museum, museum in Spain
