= TramMet =

A tram on Trambaix line T3

Tramvia Metropolità, SA (TramMet) is a company based in Barcelona, Catalonia, Spain. It's a joint venture of the companies FCC-Vivendi, COMSA, Acciona-Necso, Alstom, Sarbus, Soler&Sauret, Banc Sabadell and Société Générale. It was created in 1999 to operate the new tram systems in Barcelona, Trambaix and Trambesòs, from April 27, 2000. The Trambaix network was inaugurated on April 3, 2004, followed by the inauguration of Trambesòs on May 8 of that year. The concession to the company will end in 2032.

== Rolling stock ==
- 41 Alstom Citadis 302

== See also ==
- Autoritat del Transport Metropolità
