= Daniel Garbade =

Swiss painter, illustrator, art director, property master and publisher

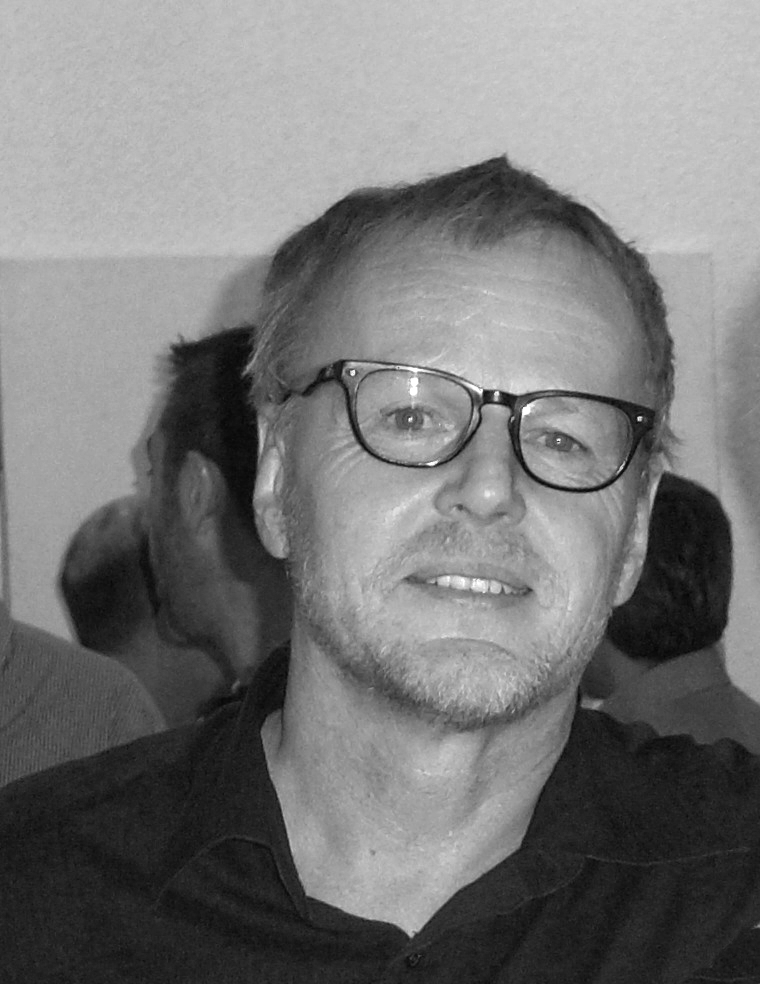
- Born: 1957 (age 68–69); Zürich, Switzerland
- Known for: Painting, illustration, art direction
- Notable work: Grave plate for Mikhail Bakunin, Portrait of Nancy Cunard
- Style: Expressionist
- Website: www.garbade.es

Daniel Garbade (born 1957) is a Spanish painter, illustrator, art director, property master and publisher.

== Biography ==
Born in Switzerland from Swiss-Cuban origins, Garbade is the grand-nephew of Adrien Lachenal, great-grandchild of Cuban sculptor Fernando Heydrich, grandson of Theodore Garbade and cousin of sculptor Juan Esnard Heydrich.

Garbade lived in Spain from 1983 to 2011, then taking residence in his hometown Zürich, to exhibit at the Peyer Fine Art Gallery in Zürich. In 2016 he returned to Spain, living in Mascaraque, Castilla–La Mancha and gained the Spanish Citizenship in 2023.

== Work ==
Garbade is one of Spanish expressionists, who turned to Pop art during the Movida madrileña. His stroke is personal and minimalistic. Writer Alvaro Pombo described Garbade's work by coining the term "garbatear". Garbade's portraits are melancholy yet humorous and aim to show mankind at its core. Nobel Prize winner José Saramago once said, "Garbade shows us humanity where it unfolds" His most well-known portraits include those of Nancy Cunard, King Juan Carlos I, Rodriguez Zapatero, Kofi Annan and Pedro Almodovar. His image of the naked Pope Benedict XVI attracted attention in 2006 and was removed from his exhibition at the request of the Swiss government.

=== Poetry ===
In 1987, he took part in the publication of poems as co-founder of the Signos Magazine.

=== Sculpture ===
On behalf of the Dadaists of the Cabaret Voltaire in Zürich, he designed the gravestone of Mikhail Bakunin at the Bremgarten cemetery, Berne. The City of Toledo in Spain invited Garbade to exhibit his sculptures at the Oratorio de San Felipe Neri in 2022.

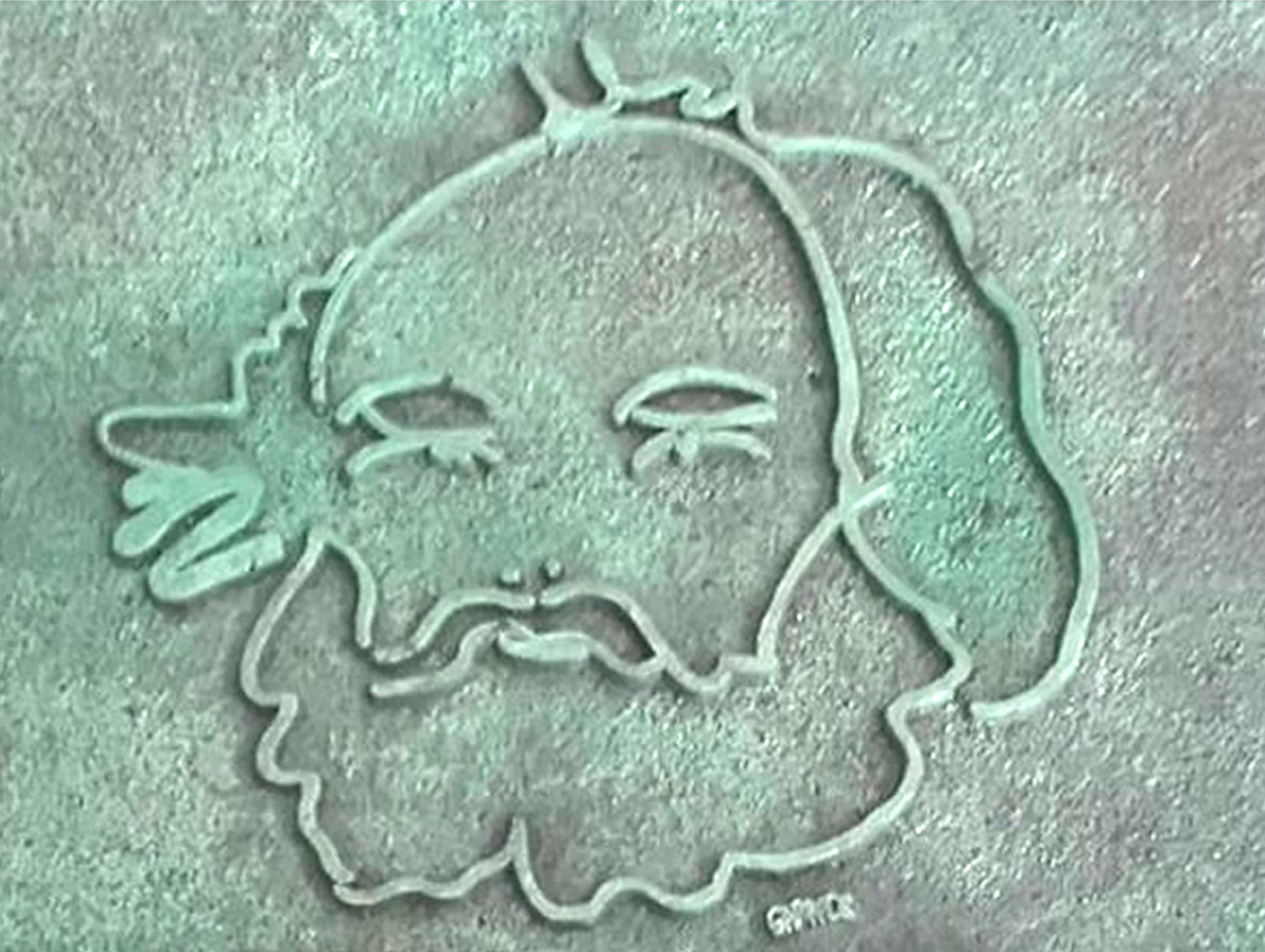
Garbade's bronze sculpture at the gravestone of Mikhail Bakunin, Bremgarten Cemetery, Berne, Switzerland.

=== South America ===
Garbade has close ties to South America and Cuba through his family: Garbade's grandmother, Aída, was from Matanzas. Mexico showed his works at the National Museum of Tequila in Jarisco (2021), at the Museum of the Agave Landscape and Mining (2022) and at the Galerie Kin (1993) in Mexico City. In 2021, Garbade showed his works in the exhibition dedicated to the Bicentennial of the Independence of Peru at the Casa Museo Mario Vargas Llosa in Arequipa (2021). In May 2022, The Ludwig Foundation of Cuba invited the artist to present his works about his origins in Cuba in its Gallery in Havana and in the Visual Arts Center of Matanzas, the Pedro Esquerré Gallery, in two parallel exhibitions.

== Film ==
Since 1979, Garbade has worked as a production manager and later as Property master for advertising and feature films at Condor Films, Barney, Tardio & Melsky, Warner Bros, TF1 and The Ladd Company. Garbade as had a hand in films such as "Five Days One Summer" by Fred Zinnemann and "Espion leve toi" by Yves Boisset.

== Engagement ==
An avid fighter for the rights of homosexuals, he worked for the American Foundation for AIDS Research (AmfAR) and the Fundación Triángulo in Madrid, where he illustrated texts in various writings such as Orientaciones. In the book Cosas de casados, which was later turned into an exhibition, he published his drawings on the subject of homosexuality in Art together with David Hockney and Tom of Finland. In 2022, Garbade was invited by the Embassy of Switzerland in India to give a lecture on The Queer in Art and Real Life with Curator Dr.Alka Pande, Saurabh Kirpal, Advocate and LGBTQ+ activist and Vivek Raj Anand, CEO of Humsafar Trust.

His wedding (2006) was the first same-sex marriage in Mascaraque, Castilla–La Mancha, Spain

Garbade's exhibition Côctel, with contributions from writers such as Rafael Alberti, Vicente Molina Foix, José Saramago, Luis Antonio de Villena, Jesús Ferrero and Leopoldo Alas, discusses tolerance in the Convent of San Ildefonso (Toledo). The exhibition was supported by the Vice-President of UNESCO and the Swiss Government.

Garbade has been a source of inspiration for intercultural cooperation between Switzerland and Spain since 1983. He brought the first Swiss gallery to the ARCO Art fair in 1985, exhibiting artists like Pablo Runyan or Jorge Arxe. He co-operated with Werner Bischof and John Armleder at the Museo Reina Sofia, Circulo de Bellas Artes and other galleries in the Swiss weeks of Madrid in 1988. In 2012 he was invited to the exhibitions Hispano-Suizo in Zürich, and in 2014 to Hispano -Suizo Madrid. As curator, he conducted the exhibition Desayuno para Inmigrantes on the immigration of Swiss artists in Spain. In 1989, he helped François Lachenal for the exhibition du Greco a Goya, a homage to the works of art from the Museo del Prado saved during the Spanish Civil War in Geneva. His grandfather Paul Lachenal was involved in the safeguard of the paintings as delegate of the International Committee.

== Galleries and collections ==
- Museo de la Hermandad, Toledo, Spain
- Bienal del Tajo, Toledo, Spain
- Convento of San Ildefonso, Toledo, Spain
- Caja Rural, Retrospectiva, Toledo, Spain
- Gallery Quorum, Madrid, Spain
- Arco (feria de arte), Madrid, Spain
- Gallery Dionis Bennassar, Madrid, Spain
- Peyer Fine Art, Zürich, Switzerland
- Gallery Ziegler, Zürich, Switzerland
- ART Basel, Prints, Galeria Barês, Paris, France
- Galería Barês, Paris, France
- Galeria Arthêmes, Burdeos, France
- Galería Knapp, Lausanne, Switzerland
- Tossan Tossan, Gallery, New York, US
- Gallery Nathan, Zürich, Switzerland
- Stephen Floersheimer, Orselina, Switzerland
- Gallery Kin, Mexico
- Gloria Kirby Collection, Tánger, Morocco
- Kunstszene Luzern, Switzerland
- Caja Rural, Toledo, Retrospectiva, Spain
- Biblioteca Nacional de España, Madrid, Spain
- Kunstsammlung des Bundes, BAK, Switzerland
- Musee de la ville de Geneve, Switzerland
- Madrid Metro, Spain
- Ateneo de Madrid, Spain
- Institut des cultures arabes et méditerranéennes, Geneva, Switzerland
- Haegeumgang Theme Museum, Geoje, South Korea
- National Museum of Tequila, Jalisco, Mexico
- Municipal Museum of Alcázar de San Juan, Spain
- Museum La Maison d'Eros, Medinacelli, Spain
- Museum Zapadores Ciudad del Arte, Madrid, Spain
- Central State Museum of Kazakhstan, Almaty, Kazakhstan

== Books ==
- Alvaro Pombo: Los oleos y dibujos de Garbade. Nicolás Edic., Toledo 1988, OCLC 434557179
- Giusepe Ungaretti: Nueve poemas inéditos, Madrid 1990 ISBN 84-87095-67-4
- Leopoldo Alas: Signos11/12. Editor Libertarias, Madrid 1991, OCLC 77617403
- Daniel Garbade:Encres de chine autor du Fake-book. Knapp, Lausanne 1992,(https://www.worldcat.org/title/daniel-garbade-encres-de-chine-autour-du-fake-book-galerie-knapp-lausanne-16-mai-27-juin-1992/oclc/715285050&referer=brief_results)
- Agustina Bessa Luís:Le Fake-book. Joel Barès, Paris 1992,
- Eduardo Naval, Daniel Garbade:Retrospectiva. Caja Rural, Toledo 1993
- José Saramago, Vicente Molina Foix u.a.: Côctel. El Wisli, Toledo 1996, ISBN 978-84-615-3679-5
- Daniel Garbade: Pinturas. Editor Miguel Barbaran PI, Madrid 2000, (https://www.worldcat.org/title/daniel-garbade-pinturas-junio-2000-alejandro-arteche-phe00/oclc/795743991&referer=brief_results)
- Daniel Garbade u.a.: Desayuno para Inmigrantes. Ayuntamiento de Madrid, Madrid 2003
- Leopoldo Alas:Hablar desde el trapecio, Editor Libertarias, Madrid 1995, ISBN 84-7683-428-4
- Juan María Crespo: Aprendemos con las letras.Editor McGraw-Hill, Madrid 2002, ISBN 84-481-3600-4
- Michael T. Ganz: La petite mort. El Wisli, Madrid 2006, S. 4–5, ISBN 978-84-615-3680-1
- José Luís Uriondo: La aventura de las matemáticas.Editor McGraw-Hill, Madrid 2002, ISBN 84-481-3490-7
- José Luís Uriondo: Aprendemos con las matemáticas. Mc Graw Hill, Madrid 2002 ISBN 978-84-481-3493-8
- Beatriz Gimeno: Cosas de Casados.Editor Asociacion Cultural Visible, Madrid 2006, ISBN 978-84-611-1454-2
- Daniel Garbade: Reload.Editor El Wisli, Madrid 2011, ISBN 978-84-615-3858-4
- Leopoldo Alas: La loca aventura de vivir, Editor Odisea, Madrid 2009, ISBN 978-84-92609-11-6
- Sivasailam Thiagarajan:Interaktive Trainingsmethoden, Editor Wochenschau Verlag, Dr, Kurt Debus GMBH, Schwalbach am Taunus 2014, ISBN 978-3-89974-989-2,
- Daniel Garbade:Cut, Editor Artzeitmagazine, Zúrich 2014, ISBN 978-3-03304705-1
- Daniel Garbade: En cama con Greco y Picasso, Toledo 2018, ISBN 978-84-09-04267-8
- José Infante: Goya on the Beach, Madrid 2019, ISBN 978-84-09-09491-2
- Daniel Garbade: Armas y Almas, Madrid 2019, ISBN 978-84-09-08862-1
- Nuria Delgado: Descends au Sud: Al-Andalus, ICAM Geneva 2020,
