= Novísimos =

Group of Spanish poets

The Novísimos - translated as the "Newest Ones" - were a poetic group in Spain who took their name from an anthology in which the Catalan critic Josep Maria Castellet gathered the work of the majority of the youngest and most experimental poets in the decade of the 1970s: Nueve novísimos poetas españoles (Nine Very New Spanish Poets), Barcelona, 1970. Nevertheless, they were often referred to as the "venecianos" (Venetians), in allusion to one of the poems in the anthology, Oda a Venecia ante el mar de los teatros ("Ode to Venice in front of the theatre sea") by Pere Gimferrer.

== History ==
This anthology was the birth certificate of the poetic group, and it appeared divided in two sections:

- "Los Seniors" (seniors): Manuel Vázquez Montalbán, Antonio Martínez Sarrión and José María Álvarez
- "La Coqueluche" (younger talents): Félix de Azúa, Pere Gimferrer, Vicente Molina Foix, Guillermo Carnero, Ana María Moix and Leopoldo María Panero.

The group's characteristics are:

1. Absolute formal freedom.
2. Automatic writing, and various techniques such as ellipsis, syncope and collage.
3. Introduction of exotic elements, artifices.
4. Influence from the mass media and cinema.
5. Influence from popular culture and popular myths: music, mainstream cinema, comic strips. (A kind of literary pop influenced by the aesthetics of Andy Warhol.)

Their literary formation was fundamentally foreign and cosmopolitan, which meant:

1. Rejection of the immediate Spanish tradition, with the exceptions of Vicente Aleixandre, Luis Cernuda and Jaime Gil de Biedma.
2. Discovery of the "damned" writers in the Spanish language: Octavio Paz, José Lezama Lima and the Baroque writers such as Francisco de Quevedo and Luis de Góngora among many others.
3. Studying of the culturalists T. S. Eliot and Ezra Pound, of Kavafis, Saint-John Perse, Wallace Stevens and the French surrealists.
4. Restoration of Rubén Darío's modernismo (not to be confused with modernism).

The poetics included in the anthology declare, above all, the primacy of language and style, and express an enormous scepticism in the value of poetry and in the occupation of the poet. "Poetry is useless" would be the slogan that better defines the attitude of this group in 1970.

Basically, two tendencies coexisted inside the group: the culturalist (Guillermo Carnero, José María Álvarez, Pere Gimferrer), and the tendency connected to pop aesthetic, counterculture and pop culture (Manuel Vázquez Montalbán, Leopoldo María Panero).

== Other uses of the term ==
A generation of Puerto Rican artists coming of age in the 1990s have been referred to as "Los Novísimos" after art critic Manuel Alvarez Lezama applied the moniker to them in a 1995 review. According to curator Deborah Cullen, artists of the generation born after 1964, including Nayda Collazo-Llorens, Yvelisse Jímenez, Charles Juhász-Alvarado, Freddie Mercado, Ana Rosa Rivera Merrero, Fernando Paes, José Jorge Román, Carlos Rivera Villafañe, Eric Hayden French Circuns and Aaron Salabarrías Valle, as well as the US and Cuban born duo, Allora & Calzadilla, continued "working in experimental, site-specific and nontraditional modes begun in earlier generations, by artists such as Rafael Ferrer and Rafael Montañez Ortiz, and then Antonio Martorell, José Morales, and Pepón Osorio.
