= Leopoldo Alas Mínguez =

Spanish writer, poet and editor

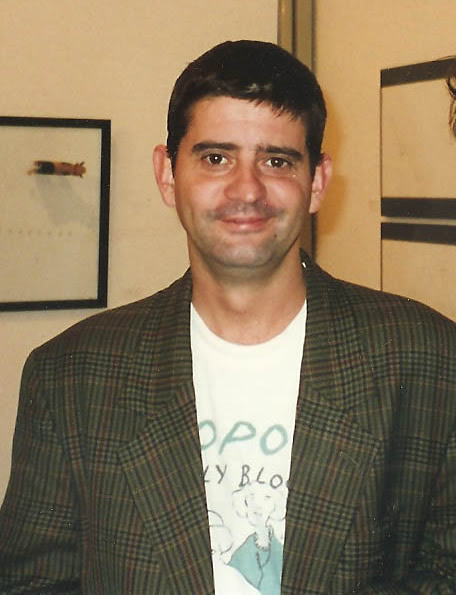
- Born: 1962; Arnedo, Spain
- Died: 2008 (aged 45–46); Madrid, Spain
- Occupations: Poet and writer
- Writing career
- Language: Spanish
- Notable work: La loca ventura de vivir

Leopoldo Alas Mínguez (4 September 1962 in Arnedo – 1 August 2008 in Madrid) was a Spanish writer, poet and editor. He was the grand nephew of Leopoldo Alas "Clarin".

He studied in Italian philology, and was one of the most important authors of homosexual literature in Spain. Between 1987 and 1992 he directed Signos Magazine, which he founded together with Luis Cremades and Daniel Garbade, publishing important poetry by Rafael Alberti, Rainer Maria Rilke, Vicente Molina Foix. Since 1986 he had written numerous articles for magazines and newspapers.

== Novels ==
- Bochorno (1991)
- El extraño caso de Gaspar Ganijosa (2001)
- A través de un espejo oscuro (2005)
- La loca aventura de vivir (obra póstuma, 2009) ISBN 978-84-92609-11-6

== Poetry ==
- Los palcos (1988)
- La condición y el tiempo Editor.Huerga y Fierro editores col. Signos, 1992, ISBN 8480620005
- La posesión del miedo (1996)
- El triunfo del vacío (2004)
- Concierto del desorden (2007)
- Nostalgia de siglos y Con estas mismas distancias (2011)

== Theatre ==
- Última toma (1985)
- La pasión de madame Artú (1992)
- Sin demonio no hay fortuna (1987). LibRadioreto of an ópera.
- Estamos en el aire (1991). Libreto of an ópera.

== Catalogues ==
He published texts for catalogues and art publications about different artists, as for Swiss artist Daniel Garbade, in Cóctel, published by El Wisli, 1996, together with by de José Saramago, Rafael Alberti, Jesús Ferrero, Vicente Molina Foix.a Foix

- Catalogue "Coctel" Toledo 1996, ISBN 978-84-615-3679-5

== Radio ==
Starting septiembre 2004 until his death, Leopoldo Alas conducted the programa Entiendas o no entiendas at Radio 5, Radio Nacional de Espana
