= Mascaraque =

- Municipality
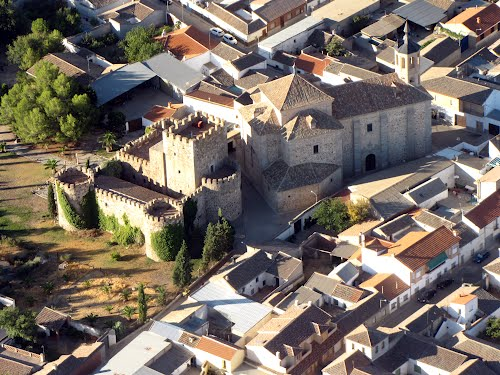
- Aerial view of Mascaraque, showing Castle of Juan de Padilla and Mascaraque Church

- Flag Coat of arms

- Location of Toledo within the Castile-La Mancha Mascaraque (Spain)
- Coordinates: 39°43′N 3°49′W
- Country: Spain
- Autonomous community: Castile-La Mancha
- Province: Toledo
- Comarca: Mancha Alta de Toledo

Area
  - Total: 65 km^{2} (25 sq mi)
- Elevation: 714 m (2,343 ft)

Population (2025-01-01)
  - Total: 441
  - Density: 6.8/km^{2} (18/sq mi)
- Time zone: UTC+1 (CET)
  - Summer (DST): UTC+2 (CEST)

Mascaraque is a municipality located in the province of Toledo, Castile-La Mancha, Spain. According to the 2006 census (INE), the municipality had a population of 550 inhabitants.

== History ==
The origin of the town goes back to the times of Arab domination. Its castle was built in the 14th century, and renovated in 1518 when it was turned into the fortress-palace of Juan de Padilla. At that time locality acquired the category of villa that differentiated it from the nearby villages.

Today Mascaraque can testify to the urban aspirations characteristic of a villa, with its castle-fortress and several small palaces with distinctive shields.

During the War of Independence, the municipal archives were burned, so that little information is known about the past of the municipality. During the 19th century, it resisted the occupation of the Carlistas, and the population was defended with a militia of its own. During the invasion by the forces of Basilio (1837–1838), Mascaraque was the only population in the area which refused to give supplies requested by the Carlist generals, reason why the later government authorized them to include the phrase "They did not fear" in their coat of arms.

== Demographics ==
Historical population
Year	Pop.	±%
1900	1,092	—
1910	1,133	+3.8%
1920	1,113	−1.8%
1930	1,082	−2.8%
1940	1,002	−7.4%
1950	1,022	+2.0%
1960	1,017	−0.5%
1970	656	−35.5%
1981	587	−10.5%
1991	550	−6.3%
2001	474	−13.8%
2011	522	+10.1%
2021	413	−20.9%
2023	430	+4.1%
Source: INE

== Monuments ==
- Castle of Mascaraque, built in 14th century. Ruined by wars, it was bought by José Manuel Sierra Frade and totally rebuilt between 1980 and 1985.
- Church of Santa María Magdalena: 18th century
- Ermita de Los Cristos: small chapel. Today it stores some reproductions of paintings by Juan Correa de Vivar

== Notable people ==
- Pedro López de Padilla: mayor of Toledo early 16th century; son of Sancho de Padilla (builder of Mascaraque Castle) and father of Juan de Padilla (1490–1521).
- Juan Correa de Vivar (1510?–1566): Renaissance painter
- Ana de Sande y Padilla (1610–1659): First duchess of Abrantes, II marquise de Valdefuentes
- Pablo Manzano Arellano (1855–1949): painter
- José Manuel Sierra Frade: Did the reconstruction of the castle as its new owner in 1980–1985
- Faustino Lara Ibáñez (current): contemporary novelist
- María de Gracia Peralta Martín (current): contemporary poet
- Daniel Garbade (1957–) Swiss artist and art director (Espion leve toi) has lived there since 1987, sculptor of Bakunin’s grave. Co-founder of Signos Magazine
- Javier Vallhonrat (1953–):National Award in photography, lived in Mascaraque until 1987
