= Zush =

Zush or ZUSH may refer to:

- Alberto Porta y Muñoz (born 1946), Catalan artist
- Shannan Lhünzê Airport (ICAO airport code)
