= Gloria Kirby =

American gallerist, art collector and photographer

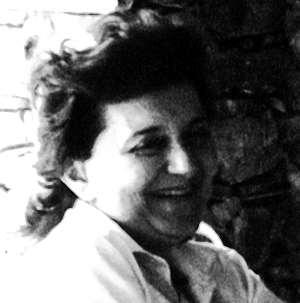
- Born: 19 April 1928; Nice, France
- Died: 2017 (aged 88–89); Tangier, Morocco
- Occupations: Galerist, art collector and photographer
- Known for: Art collector

Gloria Price Kirby, (Nice, France, April 19, 1928 – Tangier, Morocco, 2017) was an American gallerist, art collector and photographer, she founded the Vandrés Gallery in Madrid.

== Biography ==
Gloria Kirby was the daughter of Doris Landy Wayland and Sumner Moore Kirby (1895–1945). Gloria Kirby was the granddaughter of Fred Morgan Kirby, the founder of the F. M. Kirby & Co. 5 & 10-cent store chain. and a philanthropist. Kirby's company was a major rival of the much larger F. W. Woolworth & Co., and the two businesses merged in 1912. Fred Kirby then became a vice president of Woolworth's, which was listed on the New York Stock Exchange. Gloria Kirby's parents divorced in 1931. Her father subsequently married Leonida Bagration of Mukhrani. Her father died on 7 April 1945 in a hospital at Leau, near the Buchenwald Concentration Camp.

In 1948, Gloria Kirby married Robert St Clair Conahay III (1923–1984). They had three children: Richard Conahay, Cassandra Kirby-Conahay, and Robert Conahay IV (1949–1979).

=== Art collector ===
Kirby began collecting art in 1970 and her collection had more than a thousand works by international artists, including works by Rafael Bartolozzi, Claudio Bravo, Darío Villalba, Guillermo Pérez Villalta, Pablo Runyan, Rafael Cidoncha, José Paredes Jardiel, Armando Pedrosa, Roberto González Fernández, Zush, Daniel Garbade, José Hernández, Juan Muñoz, Luis Gordillo, Juan Giralt, Antoni Mutadas, Joan Hermández Pijuan, Jordy Texidor, Ceseepe, Costus and Miquel Navarro.

She was a friend of the writer and composer Paul Bowles, and established the original Paul Bowles room (in 2010 it was expanded to three rooms, now named the Paul Bowles Wing) with her acquired photographs, furniture and documents dedicated to Bowles at the American Legation, Tangier.

=== Gallerist ===
Kirby lived in France and studied in the United States. In 1965, she moved to Madrid, where she met Fernando Vijande. Together, they founded the Vandrès Gallery, whose selection of artists and bold presentation of avant-garde exhibitions during the fascist Franco regime made it well known. Franco's censorship closed the collective exhibition "La Paloma" with works in homage to Pablo Picasso, in which artist Alfredo Alcaín exhibited a naked doll; the exhibit reopened a few days later, after the doll was dressed with panties. In 1980, the Vandrés Gallery was chosen as the main provider for the exhibition at the Solomon R. Guggenheim Museum about Spanish art: New Images From Spain (1980).

== Literature ==
- Claudia, Arbulú Soto (2015). Los Catalanes de París: un análisis estético (in Spanish). Dykinson. ISBN 9788490858042.
- Rafael Cervera Torres: Alaska y otras historias de la movida, Random House, Mondadori
- Pablo J. Rico: Veinticinco años de arte en España: creación en libertad, 2003.
- Mariano Navarro:Andalucía y la modernidad: del Equipo 57 a la Generación de los 70, Centro Andaluz de Arte Contemporáneo (Seville, Spain), 2002
