= Juan Esnard Heydrich =

Cuban sculptor

- Born: 1917; Matanzas
- Died: 1998 (aged 80–81)
- Education: Escuela Nacional de Bellas Artes "San Alejandro"

Juan Esnard Heydrich (Matanzas 1917 – 1998) was a Cuban sculptor. His career took off in the 1970s with the new regime of Fidel Castro, who commissioned several monuments on the revolution and personalities of Cuban history.

He studied at the Escuela Nacional de Bellas Artes "San Alejandro", 1935 – 1940, and founded with Rafael Soriano, Manuel Rodulfo Tardo, Roberto Juan Diago Querol and José Felipe Nuñez the Provincial School of Fine Arts in Matanzas. He is second cousin of Swiss-Cuban painter Garbade and grandson of Fernando Heydrich, sculptor and founder of the aqueduct of Matanzas.

== Works ==
He was a successful sculptor, and his participation with the Juventudes Socialistas (Socialist Youth Organization) let him to be the commissioned the bust of Lieutenant General of the Liberation Army Antonio Maceo in the late 1950s. There were many technical problems, and Juan Esnard took advantage of his trip as a representative of Cuba in the Third World Congress of Youth and Students to Berlin 1951, to fuse the sculpture in stainless steel.

His ambition to dramatize political arguments is documented in his monument Nuestros muertos alcanzando los brazos. at the Museum-Memorial of Las Tunas. A human body is seen raising its clenched fist in a gesture of pain and force. It was a tribute for the 31st Anniversary of the Crime of Barbados. In this line of sculpting commemorative monuments, he made the sculptural ensemble in the Garden of the Vocational School of Exact Sciences Carlos Marx. Matanzas.

== Exhibitions ==
- Galería de Matanzas, Cuba,1951
- Museo Nacional de Cuba, Habana, 1970
- UNEAC, Habana, 1975
- Museo Nacional de Bellas Artes de La Habana, 1976
- La Tertulia Museum, Cali, Colombia, 1976
- Salón Nacional de Artes Plásticas, Havanna, 1979
- Museo Nacional, La Escultura en la Revolución,Habana, 1983

== Awards ==
- Premio Nacional de Escultura, UNEAC 78
- Secundo premio de Escultura, Salon de Arte, Havanna
- Distinción de la Cultura Cubana
- Distinción Raúl Gómez García.

== Monuments ==
- Monument José Martí, Auras, 1942
- Monument Las madres, 1954
- Monument José Martí, Matanzas
- Monument Nuestros muertos alzando los brazos in the gardens of the IPVCE Carlos Marx Matanzas
