= Durruthy =

Durruthy is a surname. Notable people with the surname include:

- Freddy Durruthy (fl. 2000s), Cuban Paralympian athlete
- Juan Roberto Diago Durruthy (born 1971), Cuban contemporary artist
- Oreol Camejo Durruthy (born 1986), Cuban volleyball player
