= Antonio Martínez Sarrión =

Spanish poet and translator (1939–2021)

Antonio Martínez Sarrión (1 February 1939 – 14 September 2021) was a Spanish poet and translator.

== Early life and education ==
Martínez Sarrión was born in Albacete, Castilla-La Mancha. He graduated with his baccalaureate in law from the University of Murcia in 1961.

== Career ==
In 1963, Martínez Sarrión moved to Madrid where he worked as a public official in the General State Administration. Between 1974 and 1976, he co-edited the literary magazine La Ilustración Poética Española e Iberoamericana with Jesús Munárriz and José Esteban.

His work was included in the acclaimed anthology of the critic Josep Maria Castellet Nueve Novísimos Poetas Españoles (Nine Brand-New Spanish Poets), which established him as a contemporary Spanish poet.

In contrast to the anti-realism of his contemporaries, the Novísimos, Martínez Sarrión is known for his sixtyeightish style that exhibits his admiration for beat poetry and the cultural, irrationalist, and mythical references (literature, cinema, jazz) that his fellows on the road would later adopt.

Another aspect of his work is occupied by memorialism. He published many articles and a trilogy of memories, which occupies his childhood years (Infancia y corrupciones, 1993); his university education (Una juventud, 1996) and his ascension to literary life. (Jazz y días de lluvia, 2002)

Martínez Sarrión was also a French translator. He created a Spanish version of the Les fleurs du Mal (The Flowers of Evil) by Charles Baudelaire, and also translated Victor Hugo's work "Lo que dice la boca de sombra y otros poemas" ("What the shadow mouth says and other poems"), Stendhal Translating Award in 1990. Other authors whose work he translated into Spanish are Jean Genet, Michel Leiris, Alfred de Musset, Nicolas Chamfort, Jacottet and Arthur Rimbaud.

He participated as a collaborator in the Spanish TV show Qué grande es el cine (How great cinema is) in La 2 and Cine en blanco y negro (Cinema in black and white) in Telemadrid, both presented and moderated by José Luis Garci.

== Works ==
=== Poetry ===
- Teatro de operaciones (Operations theatre), Carboneras de Guadazaón, El toro de barro, 1967.
- Pautas para conjurados (Guidelines for conspirators), B., Col. El Bardo, 1970.
- Ocho elegías con pie en versos antiguos, (Eight elegies with roots in ancient verses) Papeles Son Armadans, 64, 190 (1972), pp. 71–76.
- Una tromba mortal para los balleneros (Deadly downpour for the whale hunters), B., Lumen, 1975.
- Canción triste para una parva de heterodoxos, (Sad song for a heterodoxical group) Papeles de Son Armadans, 81, 242 (1976), pp. 157–162.
- El centro inaccessible. Poesía 1967-1980 (The inaccessible centre: Poetry 1967-1980), M., Hiperión, 1981 (with prologue of Jenaro Talens. Contains all his previous poetry books plus the unreleased El centro inaccessible).
- Horizonte desde la rada (Horizon from the stadium), M., Trieste, 1983.
- Sequías, (Droughts) M., Cuadernillos de Madrid, 1983.
- De acedia, (Of acedia) M., Hiperión, 1986.
- Ejercicio sobre Rilke, (Exercise over Rilke) Pamplona, Pamiela, 1988.
- Antología poética, (Poetic anthology) ed. Juan Carlos Gea, Albacete, Diputación, 1994.
- Cantil, Granada, Comares, 1995; Murcia, Nausíkaä, 2005.
- Cordura, (Sanity) B., Tusquets, 1999.
- Poeta en diwan, (Poet in diwan) Barcelona, Tusquets, 2004.
- Última fe (Antología poética 1965–1999) (Last faith: Poetic anthology 1965–1999), ed. Ángel L. Prieto de Paula, Madrid, Cátedra, 2005.

=== Other genres ===
- Diario austral, (Austral diary) Madrid, Hiperión, 1987.
- La cera que arde, (The burning wax) Albacete, Diputación, 1990.
- Infancia y corrupciones: Memorias I, (Childhood and corruptions: Memories I) Madrid, Alfaguara, 1993.
- Cargar la suerte - Diarios 1968-1992, (Load the Luck - Diaries 1968-1992) Madrid, Alfaguara, 1994.
- Una juventud - Memorias II), (A youth - Memories II) Madrid, Alfaguara, 1996.
- Murcia: un perfil, (Murcia: a profile) Cuenca, Ediciones Artesanas, 1999.
- Esquirlas - Dietario 1993-1999, (Fragments - Diary 1993-1999) Madrid, Alfaguara, 2000.
- Jazz y días de lluvia - Memorias III), (Jazz and rainy days - Memories III) Madrid, Alfaguara, 2002.
