= Roberto Juan Diago Querol =

Roberto Juan Diago y Querol (1920 in Havana, Cuba – February 20, 1955 in Madrid, Spain) was a Cuban artist specializing in photography, engraving, painting and drawing.

He studied in the Escuela Nacional de Bellas Artes "San Alejandro", Havana, Cuba and founded together with Rafael Soriano, Manuel Rodulfo Tardo, José Felipe Nuñez and Juan Esnard Heydrich the Provincial School of Fine Arts in Matanzas. His grandson, Juan Roberto Diago Durruthy (born 1971) is also a Cuban painter.

== Individual exhibitions ==
He exhibited his works "Expone Diago: Dibujos y gouaches en el Lyceum". Lyceum, Havana, 1944. In 1953 he presented "Roberto Diago". Panamerican Union, Washington, D.C., US. In 1956 "Cuarenta Dibujos de Diago". Museo Nacional de Bellas Artes, Havana. Cuba. In 1986 he presented also "Roberto Diago". Third Havana Biennial, Fondo Cubano de Bienes Culturales, Havana. Cuba. And in 2001 exhibited his works in "El negro y el puro". Espacio Abierto, Havana, Cuba.

== Collective exhibitions ==
He was included in many collective exhibitions, among them we can quote in 1941, Exposición de arte moderno y clásico (La pintura y la escultura contemporánea en Cuba). Palacio Municipal, Havana. Cuba. In 1944 he participated in Modern Cuban Painters. The Museum of Modern Art, New York City. Three years later, in 1947 he was one of the selected artist for the exhibition Paintings and Drawings of Latin America. Knoedler Galleries, New York. In 1952 he participated in the XXVI Biennale di Venezia. Venece, Italy. In 1974 some of his images were selected to conform the Selections from the Permanent Collection. Museum of Modern Art of Latin America, Washington, D.C., U.S.

== Awards ==
Among his must relevant awards can be included the Mention of Honour. XXIV Salón de Bellas Artes. Círculo de Bellas Artes, Havana, Cuba, 1942.

== Collections ==
Diago's works can be found in the permanent collections of:

- The Museum of Modern Art, New York City.
- Museo Nacional de Bellas Artes (La Plata), Argentina.
- Museo Nacional de Bellas Artes de La Habana, Havana, Cuba.
- Museum of Modern Art of Latin America, Washington, D.C.
- Kendall Art Center/The Rodriguez Collection, Miami, FL.
