= Manuel Rodulfo Tardo =

Cuban artist (1913–1998)

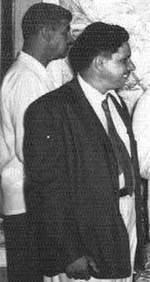
Manuel Rodulfo-Tardo

Manuel Rodulfo Tardo (February 18, 1913 in Pueblo Nuevo, Mantanzas Province, Cuba – December 22, 1998 in New York City) was a Cuban artist.

== Biography ==
He studied at the Escuela Nacional de Bellas Artes "San Alejandro", Havana, Cuba, together with Juan Esnard Heydrich y José Francisco Cobos, and at The Sculpture Center, New York City. One of his mentors was the Cuban sculptor Juan José Sicre. He was a painter as well as a sculptor.

He founded the Provincial School of Fine Arts (La Escuela de Artes Plásticas de Matanzas) with Rafael Soriano, José Felipe Núñez, Juan Esnard Heydrich and Roberto Juan Diago Querol and was elected five times as its director.

== Major commissions ==
Rodulfo Tardo was awarded many major commissioned works through his life, both in Cuba and the United States. Below some are presented with dates, when available.

1. Monument to Cuban Navy Sailors, lost during anti-submarine operations, torpedoed and sunk. (Cuban Department of Defense) Habana National Cemetery. 1943.

2. Monument of Leonor Perez, Mother of Poet Patriot Jose Marti Baliar, Havana Cuba.

3. Monument to Jose Marti, Matanzas Cuba

4. Monument to Poet Plácido Domingo, Esplanade Versalles Cuba.

5. Poet Bonifacio Byrne Parque Central, Matanzas Cuba.

6. Sacred Family Dioceses of Matanzas, Cuba.

7. Our Lady of Charity of Cobre, Cuban Patroness, Basilica National Shrine of the Immaculate Conception, Washington, D.C., USA. 1975–76.

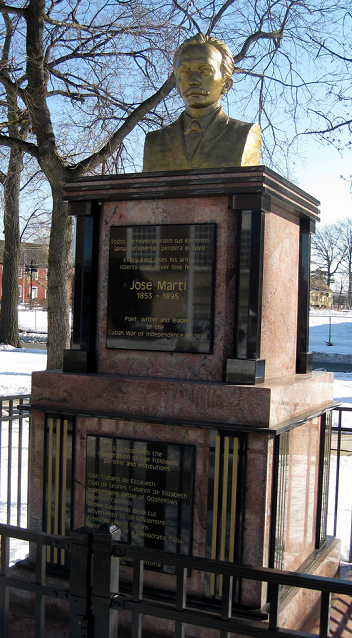
Cast bronze monument of José Martí in Elizabeth, NJ

== Individual exhibitions ==
Among his most relevant personal exhibitions can be included "Exposición Manuel Rodulfo Tardo", Lyceum, Havana, Cuba, 1941, and "Rodulfo Tardo. Recent Sculptures/Gisela Hernández. Selected Drawings", Horizon Galleries, New York CityA, 1982.

== Collectives exhibitions ==
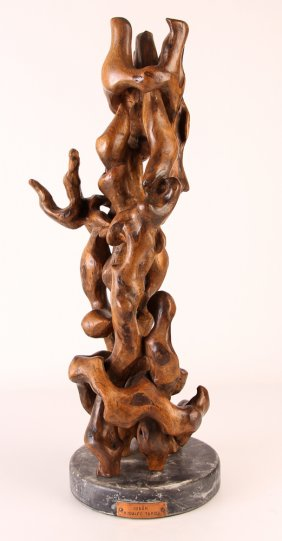
Sculpture carved from wood

He was also part of many collective exhibitions, including the first Bienal Hispanoamericana de Arte. Madrid, 1951. Instituto de Cultura Hispánica, Madrid, Spain. Some of his pieces were selected to conform the Bienal Hispano Americana de Arte. Instituto Cultural Cubano Español, Havana, Cuba, 1951. And in representation of his country his works were exhibited in the Hispanic American Artists of the United States: Argentina, Bolivia, Chile, Cuba, Uruguay Museum of Modern Art of Latin America, Washington, D.C., U.S.A., 1978.

== Awards ==
During his life he obtained many awards and recognitions. For example: the "Drawing gold medal," Primer Salón de Pintura, Dibujo y Escultura de Matanzas, Cuba, 1939. He was also awarded with "Prize Inter American Art Exhibition," University of Tampa, Tampa, Florida, U.S.A, 1950, and the "Prize of Merit" VIII Salón Nacional de Painting and Esculpture, Museo Nacional de Bellas Artes, Havana, Cuba, 1956.

== Collections ==
His most relevant collections can be found in the Museo Nacional de Bellas Artes, Havana, Cuba

The Museum of Fine Cuban Arts in Vienna, was inaugurated in 2009, with an remarkable selection of works by international Cuban artists, including important works by Manuel Rodulfo Tardo.
