= Signos Magazine =

Spanish poetry magazine

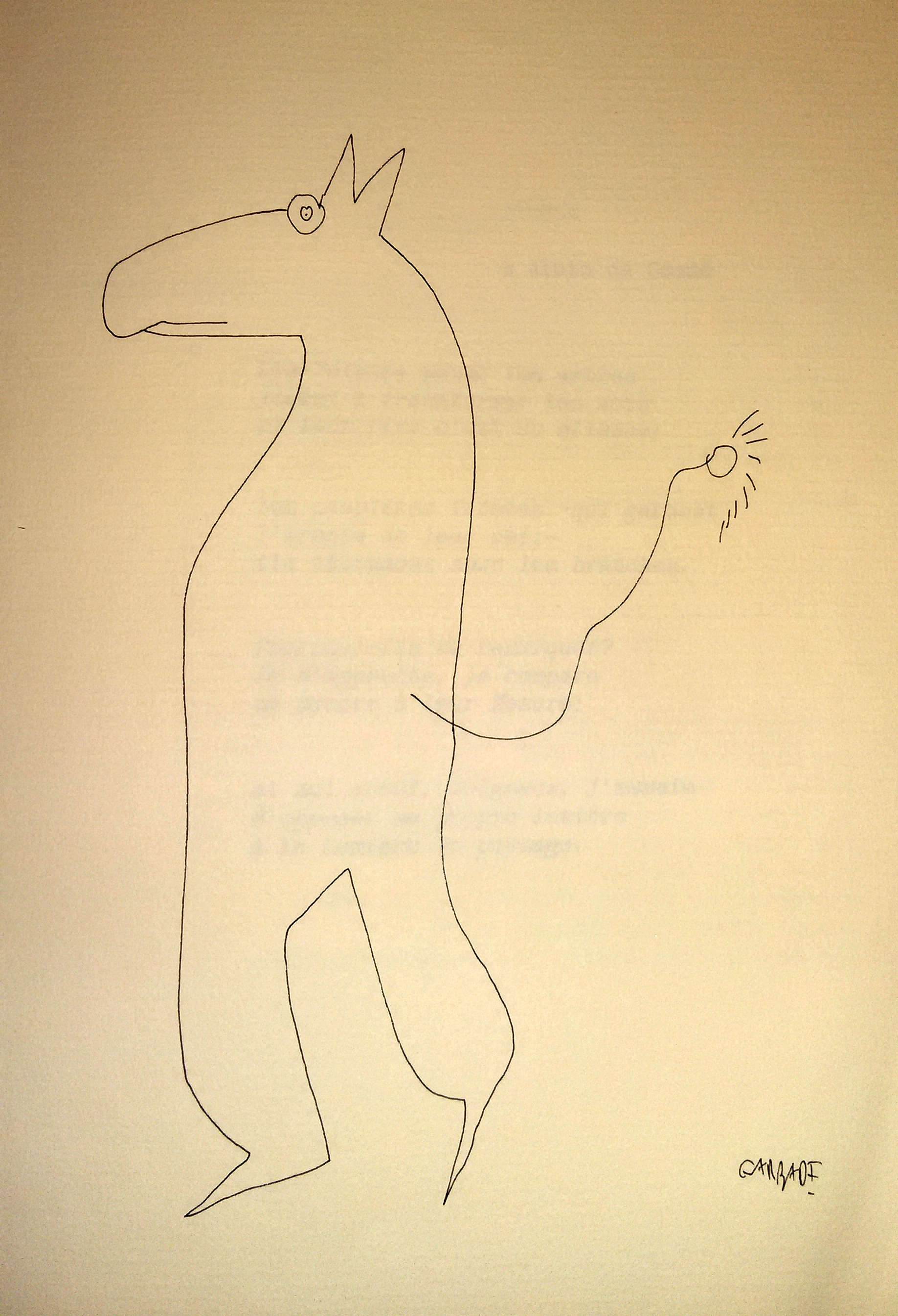
Drawing by Garbade for Signos

Signos Magazine was a Spanish magazine of poetry founded 1986 by Leopoldo Alas Minguez, Luis Cremades, Mario Miguez and Daniel Garbade. Edited first by Ediciones Libertarias and later El Observatorio, it was directed by Leopoldo Alas. After its closure in 1992, Signos turned into an editorial for contemporary Spanish poetry.

== Content ==
Dedicated to contemporary Spanish poetry, with poems by young Spanish authors like Vicente Gallego, Ángel Petisme, or Enric Benavent, it published a large number of well known Poets. Signos included poetry by Jean Cocteau, Rafael Alberti, Jaime Gil de Biedma, Rainer María Rilke, Manuel Vásquez Montalbán, Leopoldo María Panero, Ana María Moix, Pere Gimferrer, Vicente Molina Foix, Fernando Savater, Luis Antonio de Villena, Severo Sarduy, or Rafael Sanchez Ferlosio.

Each copy was illustrated and contained an original drawing. It featured artists like Rafael Alberti, Roberto Gonzalez Fernandez, or Daniel Garbade. The originals were presented together with the magazine in exhibitions at the Reina Sofia Museum or the Circulo de Bellas Artes Madrid.

== Editions ==
- Rafael Alberti, José Infante, Vicente Molina Foix, Blanca Andreu, Francisco Brines, Daniel Garbade: Signos 1, Editor Libertarias, Madrid 1988, ISBN 84-86353-31-9
- Vicente Núñez, René Maria Rilke: Signos 3, Editor Libertarias, Madrid 1988, ISBN 84 86353 -33-5
- Severo Sarduy, Luis Eduardo Aute: Signos 4, Editor Libertarias, Madrid 1988, ISBN 84-7683-101-3
- Rafael Inglada, Cesar Simón, José Antonio Mesa Torre, Fernando Savater: Signos 5/6, Editor Libertarias, Madrid 1989, ISBN 84-7683-113-7
- Rafael Pérez Estrada, Rafael Sánchez Mazas.Juan Lamillar, Rafael Ballesteros: Signos 7, Editor Libertarias, Madrid 1989, ISBN 84-7683-114-5, 1989
- Jaime Gil de Biedma, Luis Antonio de Villena, Vicente Huidobro: Signos 8, Editor Libertarias, Madrid 1990
- Rafael Alberti, Jean Cocteau, Sandro Penna: Signos 9/10, Editor Libertarias, Madrid 1988 ISBN 84-87095-67-4
- Paul Verlaine, José Infante, Luis Antonio de Villena: Signos 11/12, Editor Libertarias, Madrid 1988, OCLC:77617403,
- Frederico Leal: El sueño de los días, Madrid 1998, Editor Signos: ISBN 84 8374 014 1
- Leopoldo Alas: La condición y el tiempo, Madrid 1992, ISBN 9788480620000,
