= Andrés Trapiello =

Spanish writer

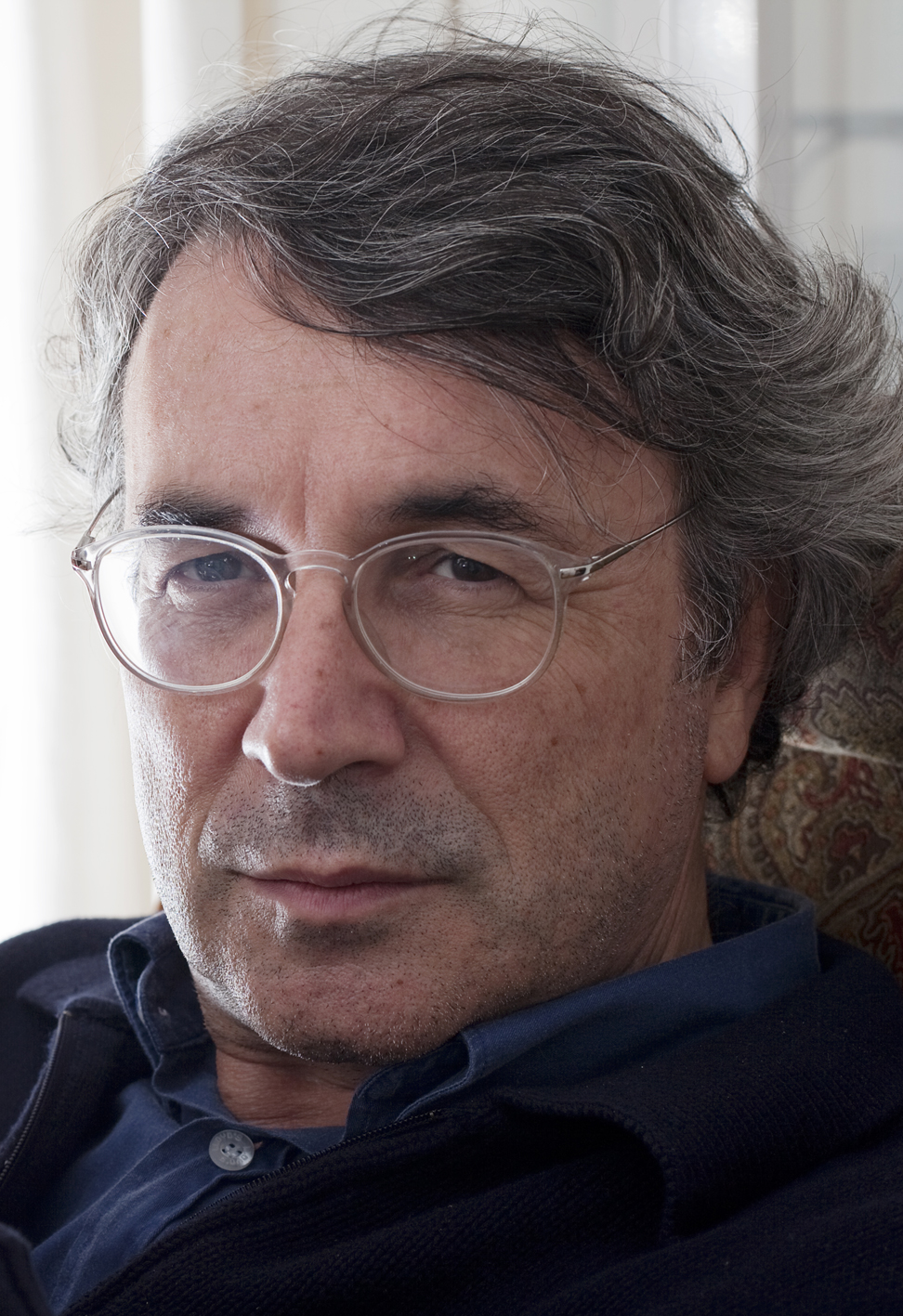
Andrés Trapiello

Andrés Trapiello (born 1953) is a noted Spanish poet and writer. He was born in Manzaneda de Torío, León, and studied at the University of Valladolid. He moved to Madrid in 1975, and has lived in the capital ever since.

His first book of poems, Junto al agua, appeared in 1980, under an imprint (Entregas y Libros de La Ventura) that he had set up himself with Juan Manuel Bonet. His debut novel La tinta simpática appeared in 1988, followed in 1990 by El gato encerrado, the first volume of his diaries. This series, under the collective title Salón de pasos perdidos, now extends to 21 volumes and is regarded as one of the major projects in contemporary Spanish literature.

He is one of a group of well-known Spanish novelists, which includes Julio Llamazares, Javier Cercas, and Jesus Ferrero, who have published fiction in the vein of "historical memory", focusing on the Spanish Civil War and the Francoist State.

Trapiello won the Premio Internacional de novela Plaza & Janés for his second novel, El buque fantasma, (1992), and the Premio de la Crítica for his book of poems Acaso una verdad (1993). Also in 1993, his collection of essays Las armas y las letras. Literatura y guerra civil 1936-1939 received the Premio don Juan de Borbón. The book was revised and significantly enlarged for a new edition in 2010.

In 2003, Trapiello's novel Los amigos del crimen perfecto won the Premio Nadal. His next novel, Al morir don Quijote, won the Premio Fundación Juan Manuel Lara in 2005. In addition to the above-mentioned works, he has published many more books, including fiction, poetry, and collections of essays and articles.

Trapiello was awarded the Premio de las Letras de la Comunidad de Madrid in 2003 for his contributions to literature, followed by the Premio de las Letras de la Comunidad de Castilla y León in 2010. He continues to write prolifically.

He was a candidate for Unión Progreso y Democracia to one of the 3 seats of the Autonomous Community of Madrid in the Spanish Senate in the Spanish general election, 2015. Other UPyD candidates were Fernando Savater and Magdalena Oliva Díaz.
