= Weeping for a Bandit =

- Spanish film poster
- Directed by: Carlos Saura
- Written by: Mario Camus; Carlos Saura
- Produced by: José Luis Dibildos
- Starring: Francisco Rabal; Lea Massari; Lino Ventura; Luis Buñuel
- Cinematography: Juan Julio Baena
- Edited by: Pedro del Rey
- Music by: Carlo Rustichelli
- Release date: 1 September 1964
- Running time: 100 minutes
- Country: Spain
- Language: Spanish

Weeping for a Bandit (Spanish: Llanto por un bandido) is a 1964 Spanish drama film directed by Carlos Saura. It was Saura's first film in color. It was co-produced with France and Italy, and starred Italian Lea Massari and French-Italian Lino Ventura. Thanks to his friendship with Saura, filmmaker Luis Buñuel has a small role. The film was entered into the 14th Berlin International Film Festival.

== Cast ==
- Francisco Rabal – José María 'El Tempranillo'
- Lea Massari – María Jerónima
- Philippe Leroy – Pedro Sánchez
- Lino Ventura – El Lutos
- Manuel Zarzo – El Sotillo
- Silvia Solar – Marquesa de los Cerros
- Fernando Sánchez Polack – Antonio (as Fernando S. Polack)
- Antonio Prieto – El Lero
- José Manuel Martín – El Tuerto
- Agustín González – Capitán Leoncio Valdés
- Venancio Muro – Jiménez
- Rafael Romero (actor) – El gitano
- Gabriele Tinti
- Luis Buñuel – El verdugo
- Antonio Buero Vallejo – El esbirro
- Pablo Runyan - Pintor inglés
- José Hernández - boy
