= José Hernández (painter) =

Spanish painter (1944–2013)

- Born: 5 January 1944; Tanger
- Died: 20 November 2013 (aged 69); Malaga
- Occupations: Painter, Illustrator
- Honours: Member of the Real Academia de Bellas Artes de San Fernando, Spain
- Website: http://www.jose-hernandez.com/principal.php

José Hernández (5 January 1944 – 20 November 2013) was a Spanish painter and plastic artist.

Born in Tangier, Morocco, in 1944, he made his first exhibition in Tanger "Librairie des Colonnes" (1962). There he was soon admitted into the artistic circles. Emilio Sanz commented: "During these spooky visits in phantasmagoric environments, I was accompanied by the very young painter José Hernández from Tangier, who was daydreaming at the age of 17 and drew angry cats." His drawings show his inclination to dream representation.

In 1964 at the age of twenty, he went to Madrid, and since 1967 dedicated himself more intensively on his graphic work. His illustrations and engravings of works by James Joyce and Arthur Rimbaud, Federico García Lorca, Franz Kafka, Ernesto Sabato, Juan Rulfo, Luis Buñuel, José Miguel Ullán, Juan de Jaúregui and Gustavo Adolfo Bécquer are well known.

Friend of Carlos Saura, he appeared with his colleagues Pablo Runyan and Luís Buñuel in Weeping for a Bandit, playing the boy.

Since 1974 he has participated in numerous theater projects as a set designer and costume designer for works by Michel de Ghelderode, Calderón de la Barca, Federico García Lorca, Antonio Buero Vallejo, Ramón María Valle-Inclán, Miguel de Cervantes, José Saramago, Francisco Nieva, Antonio Gala, Carlos Fernandez Shaw, Ignacio García May or José Zorrilla, and for operas by Manuel de Falla or Luis de Pablo.

== Prizes ==
- Premio Nacional de Artes Plásticas. Madrid, 1981.
- Premio Internacional Biella per L’Incisione, Italia.
- Medalla de Honor de la XII Internacional Exhibition of Modern Ex Libris de Malbork, Polonia.
- Medalla de Honor de la Real Academia ude Bellas Artes de Santa Isabel de Hungría de Sevilla.
- Membre titulaire de l’Académie Européenne des Sciences, des Arts et des Lettres, Paris.
- Premio Nacional de Arte Gráfico de 2006
