= Stephen Floersheimer =

Swiss investment banker, philanthropist and art collector

Stephen Helmuth Floersheimer
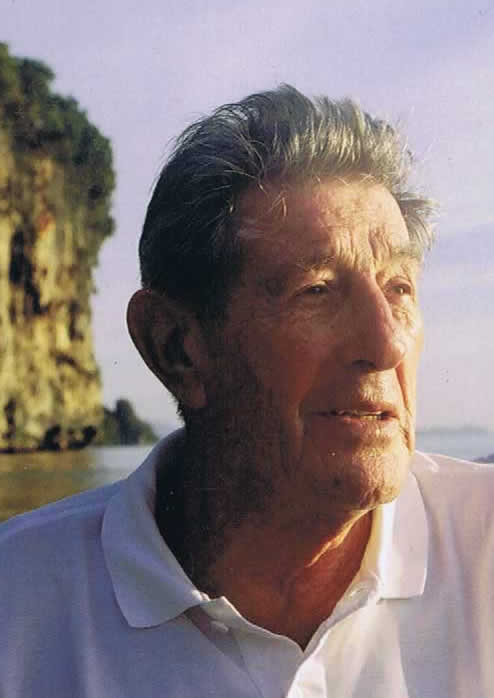
- Born: 21 March 1925; Berlin, Germany
- Died: 6 April 2011 (aged 86); Orselina
- Occupations: Banker, philanthropist
- Known for: Founder of the Floersheimer Center for Constitutional Democracy

Stephen Helmuth Floersheimer (21 March 1925 - 6 April 2011) was a Swiss investment banker, philanthropist and art collector, who founded the Floersheimer Center for Constitutional Democracy.

== Biography ==
The son of Walter and Charlotte Floersheimer, was born in Berlin to Jewish parents, he fled to Belgium in 1933 and then on to his grandfather David Floersheimer (1873–1963) in the United States. After studies at Oxford and training at a bank, he moved with his family to Zurich, Switzerland in 1970. He had two children, Daniel Floersheimer and Barbara Floersheimer Rothschild.

== Philanthropist ==
An avid fighter for justice and democracy he founded the Floersheimer Institute for Policy Studies, since 2007 called the Floersheimer studies, at the Hebrew University of Jerusalem in 1991, publishing studies in the field of society and governance in Israel.

As an honorary doctorate in humanities from Yeshiva University, he established the Floersheimer Center for Constitutional Democracy at the Cardozo School of Law, for the understanding and improvement of modern democracies. The center is dedicated to tolerance and coexistence between Palestinians and Israelis, with an emphasis on majority and minority rights in Israel, and collaborates with other universities by editing essays. With a donation of $5 million, the center began its activities in 2000, addressing issues such as the status of Guantanamo Bay.

He also founded the Walter Floersheimer Chair for Constitutional Law.

== Art collector ==
In 1989, he took charge of his father's art collection which was periodically exhibited at the UBS headquarters in Zurich. Part of the collection with works by Raoul Dufy, Camille Corot, Paul Gauguin, Chaïm Soutine and Edgar Degas was donated to the Israel Museum where it is displayed at the Lotte and Walter Floersheimer Gallery for Impressionist Art.

His contributions of impressionist works to the collection made it into one of the most important private collections in Switzerland. Displayed at Floersheimer's country estate at the Casa Carlotta, Orselina, the collection includes works by Claude Monet: Gran canale Venice, Pablo Picasso, Georges Braque, Alfred Sisley, Camille Pissarro, Titian, Oskar Schlemmer, Juan Gris, Fernand Léger and Alexander Archipenko, together with contemporary artists like Maurice Estève, Daniel Garbade, Gaston Chaissac and Charles Lapique. Sculptures by Aristide Maillol and Archipenko are shown in the surrounding gardens.

His two Arlequins, works by Juan Gris, were included in the Juan Gris exhibit at the Museo Nacional Centro de Arte Reina Sofía, Madrid, 2003.

== Sailor ==
Stephen Floersheimer built his own 36m luxury sail super yacht in 1996, with Terence Disdale acting as a styling consultant. Designed and refitted in 2015 by Camper & Nicholsons, the Yanneke Too was built using E-glass, Kevlar and epoxy with cedar core for the hull and foam for the deck. He won many races, like the Superyacht Cup in Antigua 2007 with Captain Charles Dwyer at the Helm. During more than 10 years he participated and won several times the Puckets Invitational Superyacht Rendez-vous.
