= Alberto Porta y Muñoz =

Catalan artist (1946–2025)

Alberto Porta y Muñoz (1946 – September 2025) was a Catalan artist who has been known by the pseudonyms Zush (1968–2001) and Evru (2001–2025). Porta is known for his early use of digital technology within his works and his style often presents art as a cathartic and therapeutic process, accessible to all. He was a forerunner in the implementation and normalization of art therapy, having coordinated workshops for mental patients in public institutions of fine art such as Barcelona Museum of Contemporary Art.

Porta's work is characterized by the construction of an autobiographical personal mythology. His work constitutes an accumulation of images that reference the body and all its extensions: mind, sex, and time, as well as the creation of a personal code that aims to express all that is not possible to explain in a rational way. He uses the artistic medium of his work to challenge the distinction between reason and madness by expressing multiple personalities of a single consciousness.

== Background ==
Porta was born in Barcelona in 1946. Both his parents both worked in the textile industry; his father as a businessman and his mother as a designer. As such, he grew up around fashion and drew clothing designs from a young age. At the age of 16, he met avant-garde gallery owner René Metras, who encouraged him to pursue an artistic career. For supporting him at the beginning of his career, Porta would later remember the gallerist as his "artistic father."

In 1968, during Franco's regime, artist Alberto Porta adopted the name "Zush" after being confined to a mental institution in Barcelona. That same year, he created the Evrugo Mental State, a fictional nation-state for which he devised its own alphabet, national anthem, flag, currency, and passports. In 2001, Porta discarded his alter personality of Zush which he had used for 33 years. On 23 February 2001, he symbolically changed his name to "Evru" during the digital technology and multimedia performance "ZUSH.TECURA" at the Barcelona Museum of Contemporary Art. The name Evru is derived from the first four letters of his Evrugo Mental State.

Porta died in September 2025, at the age of 79.

== Career ==
At the beginning of his career, Porta focused on white plaster sculptures, pop collages, and paintings from the lives of his alter egos, Boso and Solomo. In 1964, he shared his first studio with Jordi Galí and Silvia Gubern, in the garden of Galí and Gubern's home. Together with Antoni Llena and Àngel Jové, they organised small exhibitions there. The group of artists later became known as the Strawberry Garden group (grupo/grup del Jardí del Maduixer). The same year, at René Metras Art Gallery, Porta first showed his work in public as part of the group exhibition Presencias de nuestro tiempo (English: Presences of Our Time).

A 1966 exhibition which he participated in titled Galí, Fried, Porta was considered to be one of the first Pop art shows in the surrounding area. In 1967, he took part in the São Paulo Art Biennial with three works: Boso, Fisis and Solomo. In 1968, he staged his first solo exhibition, Alucinaciones (English: Hallucinations). That same year, after three months in a Barcelona psychiatric ward, he began referring to himself as Zush.

He was awarded a scholarship from the Foundation Juan March and Fulbright Foundation to study holography applied to the fine art at M.I.T. in 1975. In 1976 he exhibited Después del eclipse at Gloria Kirby and Fernando Vijande's Vandrés Gallery. In 1977, he took part in the Documenta VI. In 1980, his work was exhibited at New Images from Spain, at the Guggenheim Museum in New York. He was awarded a scholarship by the German Academic Exchange Service in 1986. In 1989, he took part in the exhibition Les magiciens de la terre, organized by Centre Pompidou.

His work from the late 1980s to mid-1990s began to integrate digital technology. According to the artist, this work was based on an original concept that he termed the "PsychoManualDigital, reflecting the idea that a human being is inseparable from their own mind (psyche) and body/hands (manual), while the "digital" is "the ritual and universal prosthesis of the present." One work embodying this concept is his first CD-ROM PsicoManualDigital, developed in collaboration with José Manuel Pinillo of Mubimedia, which won Barcelona's 1999 ADI-FAD Laus prize.

In 2009, he was the subject of a retrospective exhibition, "PORTA}ZUSH", at the Suñol Foundation in Barcelona. In 2015 his work was featured in the exhibition Del segon origen. Arts a Catalunya 1950-1977 (English: Second Beginning. Arts in Catalonia), at the National Art Museum of Catalonia. In 2017, his work "Dongda La Gran Campana" (English: The Great Bell Dongda) was installed in the Mas Blanch i Jové vineyard in Catalonia.

== Awards ==
- 1997: National Prize of Engraving for his innovations in graphic art.
- 1999: Prize Laus for his CD-ROM PsicoManualDigital.
- 2000: Premis Ciutat de Barcelona for the exhibitions Zush. The Campanada (MNCARS, 2000) and Zush.Tecura (MACBA, 2000–2001)
- 2003: Associació Catalana de Crítics d'Art prize for the exhibition De Zush a Evru in Barcelona
