= Municipal Museum of Alcázar de San Juan =

Archeology museum

Coordinates: 39°23′19″N 3°12′36″W

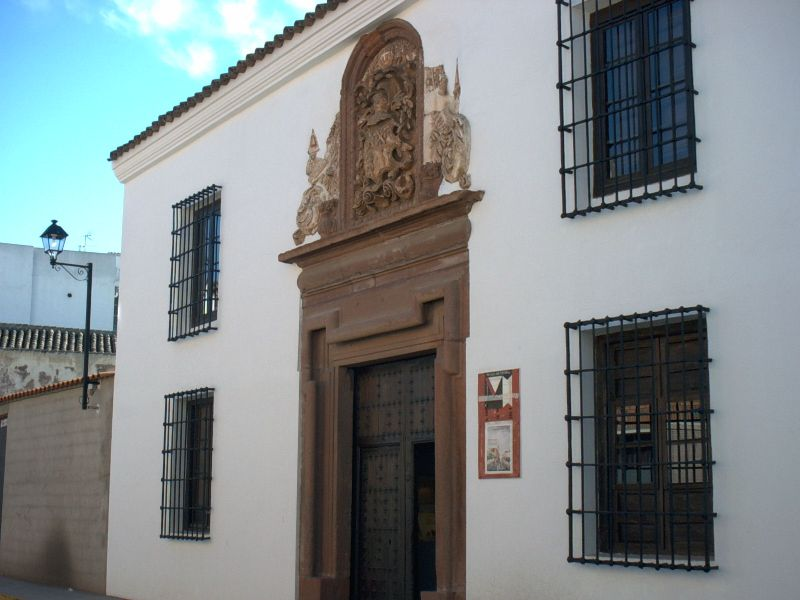
- Former name: Posada de Santo Domingo
- Established: 1991
- Location: Alcázar de San Juan
- Type: Archeology, contemporary art
- Collections: Roman

The Municipal Museum of Alcázar de San Juan is an archeology museum with contemporary art exhibitions located in the old Posada de Santo Domingo in the Municipality of Alcázar de San Juan in the province of Ciudad Real, Castilla-La-Mancha, Spain.

== History ==
Declared Bien de Interés Cultural (Cultural property of Spain) in 1991, the building that houses the museum dates back to the 16th century. It is a palace built of reddish stone with ashlars. It has its own hermitage built by order of Don Diego Sanabria in 1664. The complex became the "Posada de Santo Domingo" in the 16th century and was acquired by the city council, which turned it into a Municipal Museum in the 20th century. It has a maligned two-story central patio, the first with a portico with columns and the second with a sun gallery. The interior, with a rectangular floor plan, was recently built and is organized around the patio. Its main ornamental element is the baroque-style facade with a family coat of arms.

== Collection and exhibitions ==
The Municipal Museum houses on the first floor a permanent exhibition of archaeological pieces. The highlight are the Roman mosaics from the 2nd and 4th centuries AD. belonging to the Roman villa located in the same municipality. These are exhibited together with pieces from the Bronze Age and the Iron Age.

At the top of the museum, contemporary art is exhibited. In these rooms, they presented exhibitions with works by international and national artists such as José Diaz Gómez (1995), Juan Antonio Abellán Juliá (1998), Juan Amo Vázquez, Juan Fernández González (2001) or Eloy Teno (2000 and 2005). In 2022, an exhibition dedicated to the "El Paso" group was shown with works by Luis Feito, Manuel Viola, Antonio Saura, Manolo Millares, Juana Francés, Pablo Serrano, Antonio Suárez, Manuel Rivera, and Rafael Canogar.

In 2023 they showed the exhibition "Aires Manchego" with the works of the most important artists in the Region works by Salvador Samper, Luis Ibáñez, Antonio Mugarba, José Manuel Fernández Zarco, Diego Canogar, Daniel Garbade, Leodegario, Roberto Fernández and Caroline Culubret.

One room is exclusively dedicated to the Spanish painter and illustrator Ángel Lizcano Monedero (1846 - 1929).
