= Antonio Prieto (Spanish actor) =

Spanish actor (1905–1965)

- Born: Antonio Prieto Puerto; 2 February 1905; Aspe, Spain
- Died: 4 February 1965 (aged 60); Madrid, Spain
- Occupation: Actor
- Years active: 1926–1965
- Awards: Premio Nacional de Interpretación de España

Antonio Prieto Puerto (2 February 1905 – 4 February 1965) was a Spanish actor.

He was born in Aspe, province of Alicante in 1905.

He made his film debut in 1953 in El mensaje, then he appeared in Los Tarantos (1963) along Carmen Amaya, Rififi (1955) along Fernando Fernán-Gómez, El tímido and Llanto por un bandido (1964). His most notable role was Don Benito Rojo in Sergio Leone's film A Fistful of Dollars (1964) along with Gian Maria Volonté.

He won the Premio Nacional de Interpretación de España in 1959 for his work on stage.

He died shortly after completing his final film, Flor salvaje (1965). His death was recorded as heart failure, and he was buried in the Sacramental de San Justo cemetery in Madrid. He died in Madrid in 1965.

== Partial filmography ==
- Federales y unitarios (1927)
- Agua sangrienta (1952) as Pocero
- El mensaje (1954)
- Murió hace quince años (1954) as Ramón Iranzo
- Duelo de pasiones (1955)
- Mañana cuando amanezca (1955) as Kerson
- La vida es maravillosa (1956) as Nicolás González
- Tarde de toros (1956) as Enterado 1º
- También hay cielo sobre el mar (1956)
- Cuerda de presos (1956) as Cabo Antonio Pedroso
- Embajadores en el infierno (1956) as Coronel Chorne
- Madrugada (1957) as Lorenzo
- El anónimo (1957)
- The Night Heaven Fell (1958) as Le chef carabinier
- Los dos golfillos (1961)
- Teresa de Jesús (1962)
- Los derechos de la mujer (1963) as Padre de María José
- Alegre juventud (1963)
- El sol en el espejo (1963) as Pedro Losada
- Han robado una estrella (1963) as Don Onofre
- Sword of Zorro (1963) as Don Manuel Paredes
- Los Tarantos (1963) as Zorongo
- Bochorno (1963) as Padre de Manolo
- Suspendido en sinvergüenza (1963)
- Rififí en la ciudad (1963) as Comisario Vargas
- Primera fila (1963-1964, TV Series) as Amos
- Llanto por un bandido (1964) as El Lero
- A Fistful of Dollars (1964) as Don Benito Rojo / Don Miguel Rojo
- Gran teatro (1964, TV Series)
- La boda (1964)
- Flor salvaje (1965) as Miguel
- El tímido (1965)
- La otra cara del espejo (1965, TV Series)
- Platero y yo (1966) as Alcalde
- Una novia relámpago (1966) (final film role)
