= Juan Correa de Vivar =

Spanish artist (c. 1510–1566)

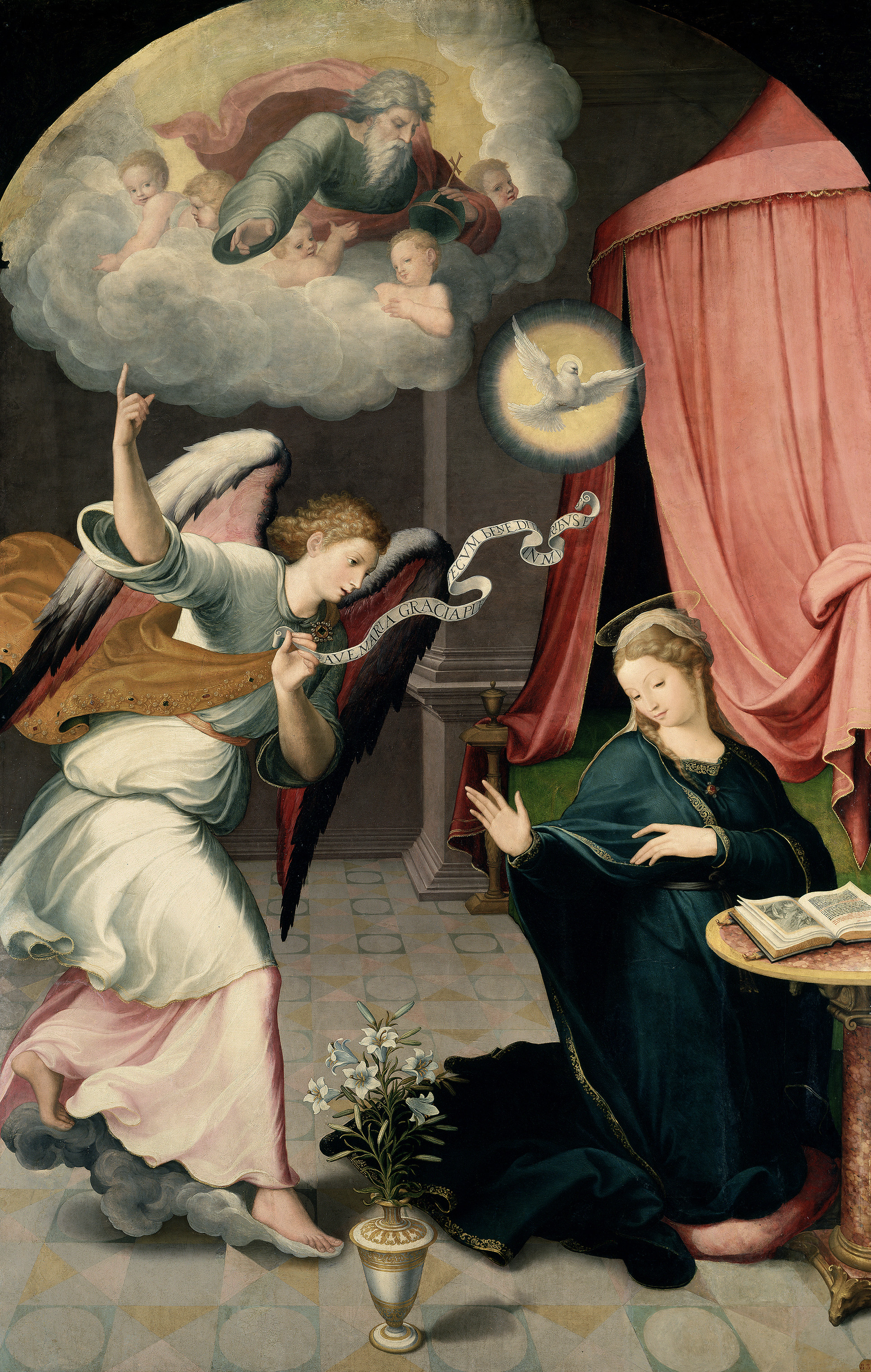
La Anunciación, Museo del Prado, 1559

Juan Correa de Vivar (c. 1510 – 16 April 1566) was a Spanish painter.

== Life ==
Correa was born in Mascaraque in the Crown of Castille; his date of birth has been determined to be around 1510. Records show he grew up wealthy. When Juan was 17 or 18 years old he joined the studio of Juan de Borgoña, where he met other Spanish artists at the time, including Pedro de Cisneros, whom he befriended.

Juan's brother Eufrasia and Eufrasia's son Rodrigo also grew up to be artists. Rodrigo was apprenticed with his uncle, and continued some of his uncle's works after his death. In Mascaraque, Juan was a substantial landowner with a nice house where he did much of his painting. He took frequent trips but always stayed in the Toledo area.

Juan was married and a religious man. It can be seen in his testament: a copy was found in the church files of Mascaraque. When he died, Juan split all his possessions between his nephew Rodrigo and the church of Mascaraque.

Juan was a well-regarded painter during his life, but many records were lost. His works and life were brought to light again when the researcher and art historian Ceán Bermudez in 1800 published a dictionary of famous artists and included a brief article about his works and Italian influences. The full reconstruction of its biography has been primarily accomplished in the 20th century.

Records show Juan died on 16 April 1566 in San Miguel. Juan's body was taken back to Mascaraque, where he was buried in the same plot where his parents were laid to rest. Many members of the artistic community came to the funeral service, including architects Alonso de Covarrubias and Nicolás de Vergara, the sculptor Francisco de Linares, and the painters Diego de Aguilar and Blas Pablín.

== Works ==
Juan was heavily influenced by Raphael. One of his most important works was the altarpiece of the church of Almonacid de Zorita, in the province of Guadalajara. This work was done in collaboration with Alonso de Covarrubias. It was destroyed in Spanish Civil War in 1936–1939. From Raphael he took his colorful tone and delicate and smooth figures. Over the years his style evolved into more dynamic forms of Mannerism, especially with respect to the way to bring about violent movement in the figures.

In the province of Toledo have been found some of Juan's better known works. They include the altarpiece of San Roque, in Almorox, and the altarpiece of the collegiate church of Torrijos, whose twelve tables were done with the help of students of their factory. The Museo del Prado of Madrid also includes many examples of his work.

His first independent works began when he was twenty years old. Some of the work came to him through familiar contacts. For example, Juan's paintings for the greater altarpiece of Clarisas of Nectarine, dated between 1532 and 1534, were funded by his uncle Don Rodrigo de Vivar. Included works in these early years are also the table of the Birth of the Santa María de Guadalupe monastery and the altarpiece of identical subject that Juan did for Guisando, which today can be found in both the Museo del Prado and the Museum of Santa Cruz, Toledo. The influence of his teacher, very evident in these first works, became more diluted over the years.

Some of his masterpieces from the 1540s can be found at the monastery of San Martin de Valdeiglesias today. There were also highly admired altarpieces that were taken after the ecclesiastical confiscation of 1836 and given to the Prado, other pinacotecas like those of Zaragoza and Vigo, and churches like San Jerónimo el Real of Madrid.

Between 1550 and 1566, the year of his death, Juan's style became more personal, taking on a mannerism style that makes his figures more forceful and energetic, but without losing his traditional elegance.
