= Juan de Borgoña =

Spanish painter

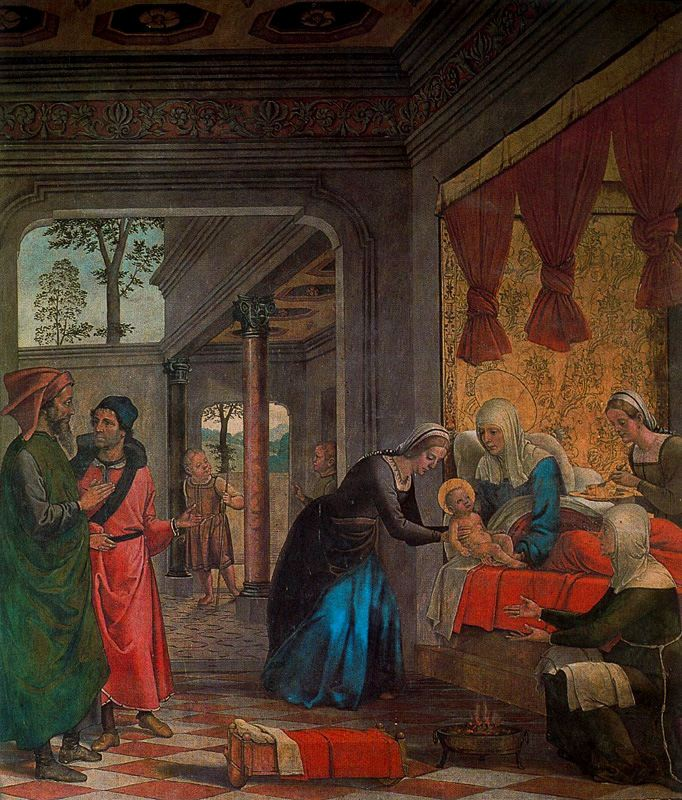
'The Birth of the Virgin', fresco by Juan de Borgoña, Cathedral of Toledo, c. 1495

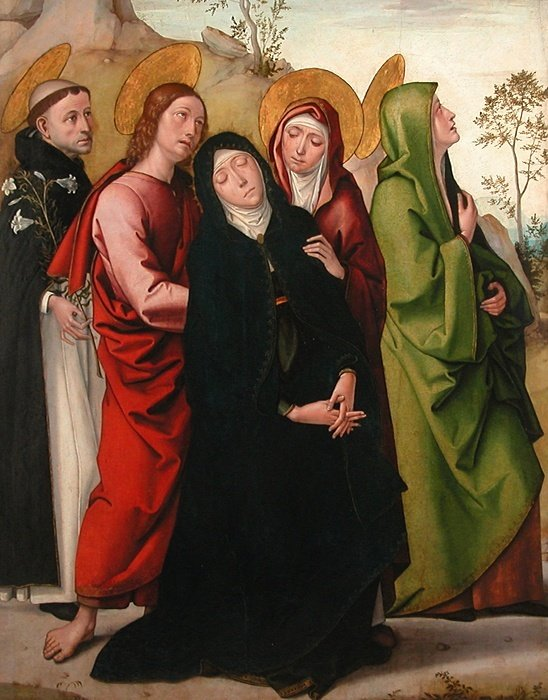
'The Virgin, Saint Dominic de Guzman, Saint John the Evangelist', painting by Juan de Borgoña, c. 1515, the Louvre

Juan de Borgoña (c. 1470–1536), was a High Renaissance painter who was born in the Duchy of Burgundy, probably just before it ceased to exist as an independent state, and was active in Spain from about 1495 to 1536. His earliest documented work was painted in 1495 for the cloister of the Cathedral of Toledo. Borgoña's compositions are well balanced with finely drawn figures in elegant, tranquil poses. They are set either against open spaces leading on to craggy landscapes or against gold embroidered drapery. There were a number of foreign painters active in Spain in this period, including Juan de Flandes. He brought the Quattrocento form of paintings into Castile.

He is not to be confused with another painter Joan de Burgunya or Borgunya who was active in Catalonia between 1510 and 1525.

Borgoña's students include Pedro de Cisneros the Elder (died 1546), Antonio de Comontes (ca. 1500–1519), Juan Correa de Vivar (ca. 1510–1566) and Borgoña's own son Juan de Borgoña the younger (ca. 1550–1565).
