= Pablo Runyan =

Panamanian surrealist painter

Pablo Runyan Kelting
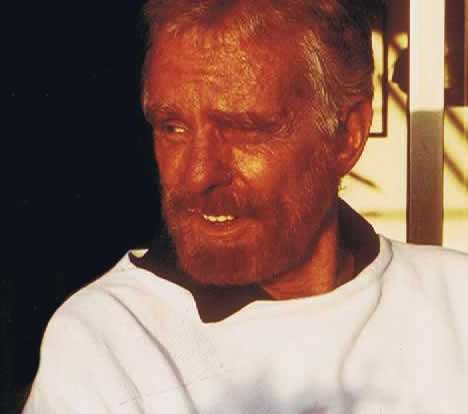
- Born: 1925; Panama
- Died: February 14, 2002 (aged 76–77); Madrid
- Occupations: painter, decorator cinema, script writer
- Style: surrealist

Pablo Runyan Kelting (1925 – February 14, 2002) was a Panamanian surrealist painter who lived and worked in Madrid from 1951 until his death in 2002.

== Biography ==
Runyan was son of a famous doctor and a mother specialized in the cultivation of bonsais, an art he continued in Spain creating an important collection. Born and raised in Panama, he moved 1943 to New York, where he met writer Anaïs Nin, who became his protector. She helped him to get into the famous Art Academy Max Ernst. Runyan was a friend of Andre Breton, Peggy Guggenheim, Max Ernst, Ava Gardner or Leonard Bernstein.

He lived in Paris and London, and moved to Madrid 1951, where he resumed painting. He also worked in cinema and theatre with personalities such as Luís Buñuel or Carlos Saura. With Saura he acted in Weeping for a bandit. 1963 playing an English painter who portrayed El Tempranillo, played by Paco Rabal. Due to his many connections, Runyan's house became a meeting place for personalities of cinema and the arts in general, where actors like Ava Gardner visited him frequently.

Since 1970, he devoted himself exclusively to painting, exhibiting his works in Galleries like the Gallery Clan or Juana Mordo, and participating along with artists such as Juan Prat at the Gallery Vandres by Gloria Kirby, 1972, with Daniel Garbade at the ARCO Art fair 1984, or Jaume Plensa, Eduardo Chillida and Antonio Saura at the Fundación Juan March, 1998.

== Exhibitions (Solo shows) ==
- Instituto Nacional, Panamá, 1949 y 1950
- Gallery Clan (Tomas Seral), Madrid, España, 1953
- Gallery Provenza, Tánger, 1954
- Gallery Fernando Fe, Madrid, España, 1956
- Gallery Vandrés, Madrid, España, 1972
- GalleryArvil, México D.F.1974
- Gallery Etienne de Causans, París, Francia, 1981
- Gallery Galería Juana Mordó, Madrid, España, 1982
- Gallery Commonwealth Club, San Francisco, California, Estados Unidos, 1984
- Gallery Walcheturn de Zurich, ARCO, Madrid, España, 1985
- Gallery Sala C.A.I. Luzan, Zaragoza, 1990
