= Josep Maria Castellet =

Spanish writer and poet (1926–2014)

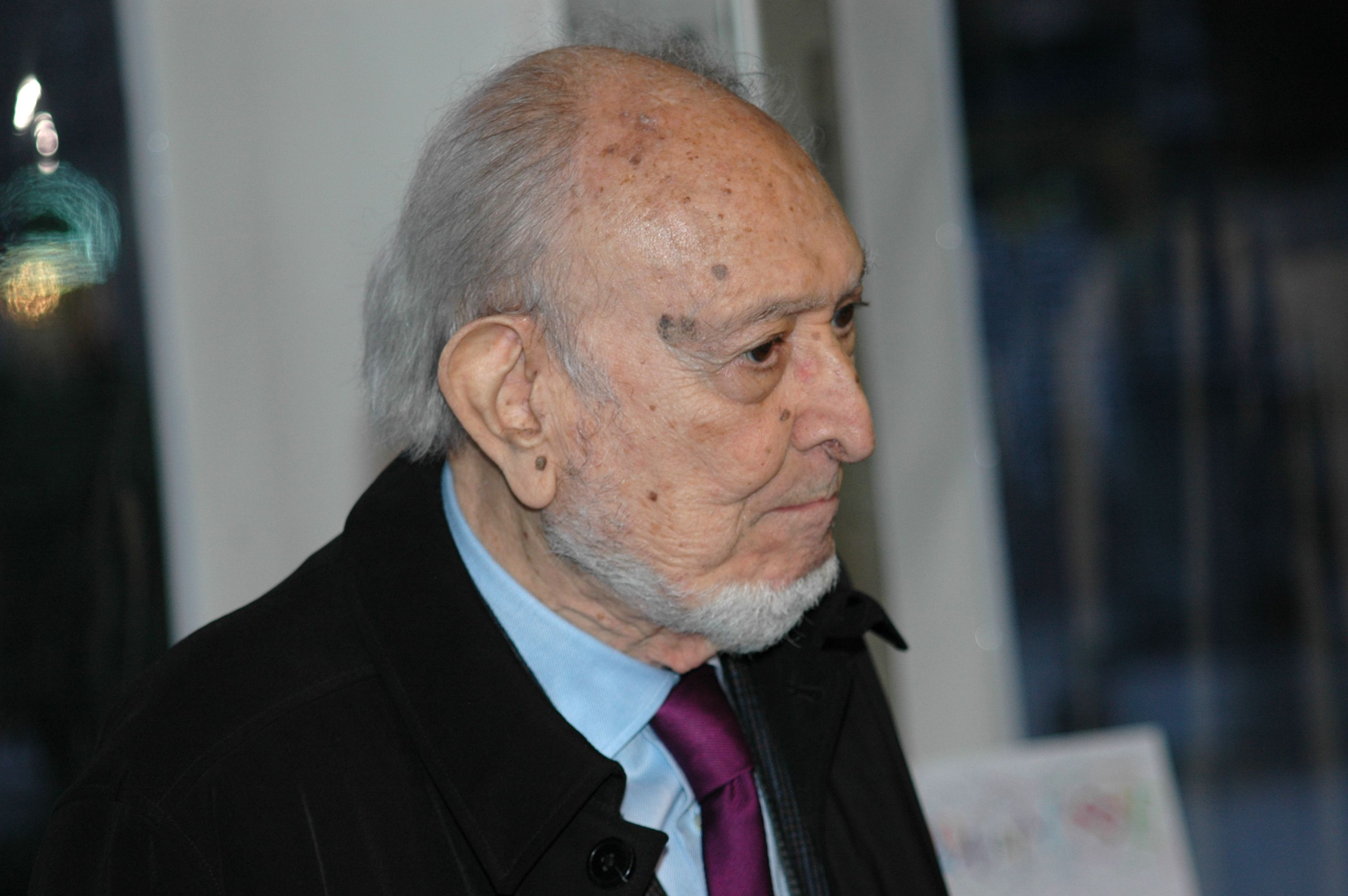
- Josep Maria Castellet in March 2009.
- Born: Josep Maria Castellet Díaz de Cossío; 15 December 1926; Barcelona, Spain
- Died: 9 January 2014 (aged 87); Barcelona, Spain
- Other name: José María Castellet
- Occupations: Writer, poet, literacy critic, publisher, editor
- Years active: 1955–2012

Josep Maria Castellet Díaz de Cossío (15 December 1926 – 9 January 2014), also known as José María Castellet, was a Spanish Catalan writer, poet, literacy critic, publisher and editor.

Born in Barcelona, he began his career in writing in 1955, and wrote novels and poetry in both Catalan and Spanish. His final novel was published in 2012.

He played an outstanding role in the Spanish and Catalan culture life of the second half of the 20th century. He was the chief editor of the publishing house Edicions 62 (1964–1996) and afterwards president of the Grup 62. He was the founder and first president of the Associació d'Escriptors en Llengua Catalana (Catalan writers association), a board member of the Comunità europea degli scrittori, the Prix international de Littérature jury and the dean of the Institució de les Lletres Catalanes (Institution of Catalan letters). Josep Maria Castellet died on 9 January 2014, aged 87, in his hometown of Barcelona.

== Biography ==
Castellet received his education as a literary critic by working for university magazines. His biographers stress his active participation in the editorial board of the magazine Laye (1950–1954), where he held a critical position towards contemporary Spanish literature, and the first publication of an article collection Notas sobre literatura española contemporánea (Notes on contemporary Spanish literature, 1955). His willingness for renewal and the discovery of the European literary critique through the Laye group led him to write La hora del lector (The reader's hour, 1957). As he wanted to make known a group of young poets that had started publishing in Laye (Carlos Barral, Jaime Gil de Biedma and José Agustín Goytisolo), he published the polemic anthology Veinte años de poesía española (20 years of Spanish poetry, 1960) that postulated historic realism. Ten years later a new anthology, Nueve novísimos poetas españoles (Nine brand-new Spanish poets, 1970), marked a change to new poetic tendencies after realism. In 1963 Castellet published, together with Joaquim Molas, Poesia catalana del segle XX (20th century Catalan poetry) guided by historic realism, a concept that he developed theoretically in Poesia, realisme, història (Poetry, realism, history, 1965).

His work as a critic during that time centered on two important books that are still considered works of reference: the structuralist reading of the poetry by Espriu —Iniciació a la poesia de Salvador Espriu (Initiation to Salvador Espriu's poetry, 1971)— and the analysis of the narrative richness of Josep Pla's work, Josep Pla o la raó narrativa (Josep Pla or narrative reason, 1978).

In Per un debat sobre la cultura a Catalunya (For a debate on culture in Catalonia, 1983) he reflected on the role of culture in the recently democratic state and the frame of the autonomous region of Catalonia. His last works consisted of memories; the first one, not published until 2007 was Dietari de 1973 (Diary of 1973). He started this presentation of himself and his times in Els escenaris de la (Memory's stages, 1988), went on with Seductors, il·lustrats i visionaris (Seducers, enlightened and visionaries, 2009) and Memòries confidencials d'un editor. Tres escriptors amics (Confidential memories of a publisher. Three befriended writers, 2012).

== Work ==
- 1955. Notas sobre literatura española contemporánea (Notes on contemporary Spanish literature), Laye, Barcelona.
- 1957. La hora del lector (The reader's hour), Seix Barral, Barcelona (Italian translation: Einaudi, Torino, 1957).
- 1958. La evolución espiritual de E. Hemingway (The spiritual evolution of E. Hemingway), Taurus, Madrid.
- 1960. Veinte años de poesía española (Twenty years of Spanish poetry), Seix Barral, Barcelona, 2d ed., 1969; 3d ed., 1962. (Italian translation: Feltrinelli, Torino, 1962). Further editions under the title: Un cuarto de siglo de poesía española (A Quarter of a Century of Spanish Poetry), Seix Barral, Barcelona, 1966, 1969, 1973.
- 1963. Poesia catalana del segle XX (20th century Catalan poetry), Edicions 62, Barcelona, 5th ed., 1980. (Together with Joaquim Molas).
- 1965. Poesia, realisme, història (Poetry, realism, history), Edicions 62, Barcelona.
- 1969. Lectura de Marcuse (Reading Marcuse), Edicions 62, Barcelona. (Originally published in Catalan. Spanish version: Seix Barral, Barcelona, Reprinted 1971).
- 1969. Ocho siglos de poesia catalana (Eight centuries of Catalan poetry), Alianza Editorial, Madrid. (Bilingual anthology, together with J. Molas) Reedited 1976.
- 1970. Nueve novísimos poetas españoles (Nine brand-new Spanish poets), Barral Editores, Barcelona. (Italian translation: Einaudi, Torino, 1976).
- 1971. Iniciación a la poesía de Salvador Espriu (Introduction to Salvador Espriu's poetry), Taurus Ediciones, Madrid, Taurus essay prize 1970. (Catalan edition: Edicions 62, Barcelona. Reedited: 1978, 1984).
- 1975. Qüestions de literatura, política i societat (Questions of literature, politics and society), Edicions 62, Barcelona.
- 1976. Literatura, ideología y política (Literature, ideology and politics), Anagrama, Barcelona.
- 1977. Maria Girona. Una pintura en llibertat (Maria Girona. Painting in liberty), Edicions 62, Barcelona. (Together with Anna Maria Moix).
- 1978. Josep Pla o la raó narrativa (Josep Pla or narrative reason), Edicions Destino, Barcelona. Josep Pla prize, 1978. (Spanish translation: Ediciones Península, Barcelona, 1982).
- 1979. Antologia general de la poesia catalana (General anthology of Catalan poetry), Edicions 62, Barcelona. (Together with J. Molas).
- 1983. Per un debat sobre la cultura a Catalunya (For a debate on culture in Catalonia), Edicions 62, Barcelona.
- 1984. Generation von 27. Gedichte (The generation of 27. Poems), Suhrkamp Verlag, Frankfurt am Main. (Together with Pere Gimferrer).
- 1985. La cultura y las culturas (Culture and the cultures), Argos Vergara, Barcelona.
- 1987. L'hora del lector. Seguit de Poesia, realisme, història (The reader's hour. Followed by Poetry, realism and history), Edicions 62, Barcelona.
- 1987. Memòries poc formals d'un editor literari, extret del llibre 'Edicions 62. Vint-i-cinc anys (1962–1987) (Informal memories of a literary editor, taken from the book 'Edicions 62, 25 years (1962–1987)), Edicions 62, Barcelona. Edició novenal.
- 1988. Els escenaris de la memòria (Memory's stages). Edicions 62, Barcelona. Reedited, 1995, 2009.
- 1988. Los escenarios de la memoria (Memory's stages, in Spanish), Anagrama, Barcelona.
- 2001. La hora del lector (The reader's hour). (Critical edition by Laureano Bonet), Ediciones Península, Barcelona.
- 2001. Nueve novísimos. Amb un “Apéndice documental” (Nine brand-new. With a documentary appendix), Ediciones Península, Barcelona, 2001. New, corrected edition, with a “sentimental appendix”, Ediciones Península, Barcelona, 2006.
- 2005. Vuit segles de poesia catalana (Eight centuries of Catalan poetry), Edicions 62, Barcelona. (Together with J. Molas).
- 2007. Dietari de 1973 (1973 Diary), Edicions 62, Barcelona.
- 2009. Seductors, il·lustrats i visionaris (Seducers, enlightened and visionaries). Edicions 62, Barcelona.
- 2010. Seductores, ilustrados y visionarios (Seducers, enlightened and visionaries, in Spanish), Anagrama, Barcelona.
- 2012. Memòries confidencials d'un editor. Tres escriptors amics (Confidential memories of a publisher. Three befriended writers), Edicions 62, Barcelona.

== Awards ==
- Taurus d'assaig (Taurus essay award), 1970.
- Gaziel de periodisme (Gaziel journalism award), 1977.
- Premi Josep Pla de narrativa (Josep Pla Award) for Josep Pla o la raó narrativa, 1977.
- Premi Joanot Martorell de narrativa (Joanot Martorell award) for Escenaris de la memòria, 1987.
- Premi Crítica Serra d'Or de Literatura i Assaig#Biografies i memòries (Serra d'Or Critics award in the section of biography and memory) for Escenaris de la memòria, 1989.
- Premi de literatura catalana de la Generalitat, modalitat prosa (Catalan literature award for prose, awarded by the regional government of Catalonia), 1989.
- Premi Lletra d'Or (Golden Letter award) for Escenaris de la memòria, 1989.
- Premi Nacional a la Trajectòria Professional i Artística (National award for the professional and artistic lifetime achievement), 2009.
- Premi Crítica Serra d'Or de Literatura i Assaig#Biografies i memòries (Serra d'Or Critics award in the section of biography and memory) for Seductors, il·lustrats i visionaris. Sis personatges en temps adversos, 2010.
- Premio Nacional de las Letras Españolas (National award of Spanish letters), 2010.

== Medals ==
- Creu de Sant Jordi of the Generalitat de Catalunya, 1983.
- Hungarian Medal Proculture of the Republic of Hungary, 1987.
- Officier de l'Ordre National du Mérite of the French government, 1988.
- Medalla de oro de las Bellas artes del Ministerio de Cultura, 1992.
- Medalla d'or al mèrit artístic de l'Ajuntament de Barcelona, 1993.
- Medalla d'Or de la Generalitat de Catalunya, 2003.
