= Vicente Molina Foix =

Spanish writer and film director (born 1946)

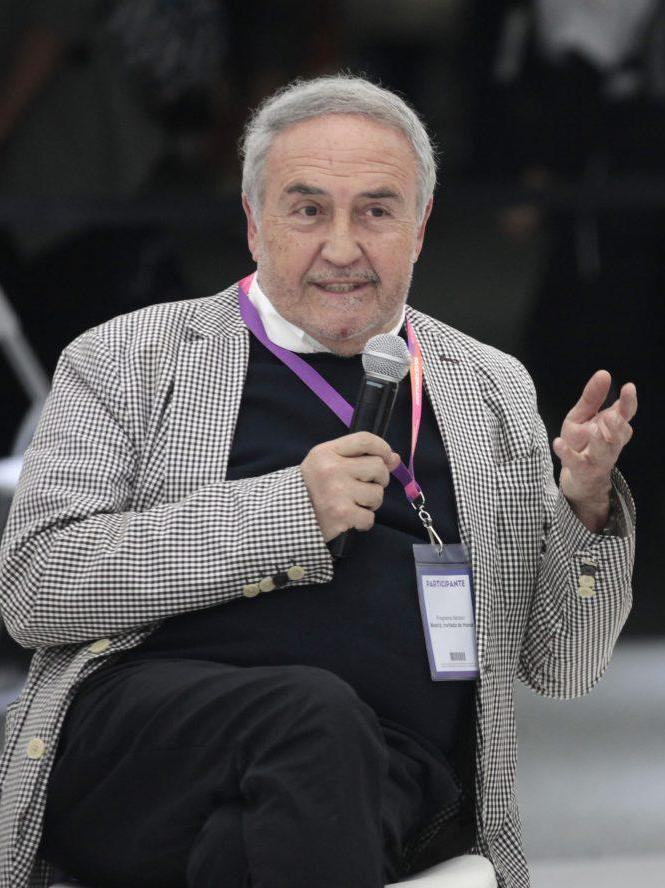
- Born: 18 October 1946 (age 79); Elche, Spain
- Education: University of Oxford
- Occupation: Writer
- Writing career
- Language: spanish

Vicente Molina Foix (born 18 October 1946) is a Spanish writer and film director.

== Biography ==
Born in Elche in 1946, he studied at the Complutense University in Madrid and at the University of London. He taught Spanish literature at the University of Oxford from 1976 to 1979. He drew the attention of critics as a young poet, and was included in a famous 1970 anthology (see Novisimos) of new Spanish poetry by the author José María Castellet. New Cinema in Spain was an account of Spanish cinema from the 2nd World War until 1976. He met with equal success as a writer of prose fiction and non-fiction, winning the Premio Barral in 1973 for his second novel Busto.

He wrote the libretto for the opera El viajero indiscreto by the Spanish composer Luis de Pablo in 1990, and has contributed to the national newspaper El País and the magazines Fotogramas and Mirlo.

In 2001, he turned to directing films. His two feature films till date are Sagitario (film) (2001), starring Ángela Molina and Eusebio Poncela, and El dios de madera (2010).

He was selected by Stanley Kubrick to translate his scripts.

== Homosexuality ==
He has openly supported homosexuals and people with HIV; he is one of the only Spanish intellectuals to do so.

=== Homosexual themes in writing ===
He is openly homosexual and much of his work draws on his gay experience. They are central themes in his two-part narrative La comunión de los atletas and Los Ladrones de niños. In that narrative, he combines homosexuality and pedophilia.

== Selected works. Novels ==
- Busto - awarded the Premio Barral 1973
- Los padres viudos - Premio Azorín 1983
- La quincena soviética - Premio Herralde 1988
- La comunión de los atletas 1989
- La misa de Baroja (1995)
- La mujer sin cabeza. 1997
- El vampiro de la calle México - Premio Alfonso García Ramos 2002
- El abrecartas - Premio Nacional de Narrativa 2007
- El invitado amargo 2014, with Luis Cremades

== Poetry ==
- Los espías del realista, Ediciones Península, Edicions 62, Barcelona, 1970.
- Vanas penas de amor, Plaza & Janés, Barcelona, 1998.
- La musa furtiva, poesía reunida 1967–2012, Vandalia, Fundación José Manuel Lara, Sevilla, 2012.
- Antinoo ciego, with Leopoldo Alas and other poetry for Signos Magazine 1989

== See also ==
- Novisimos
