= Rafael Pérez Estrada =

Spanish poet and artist (1934–2000)

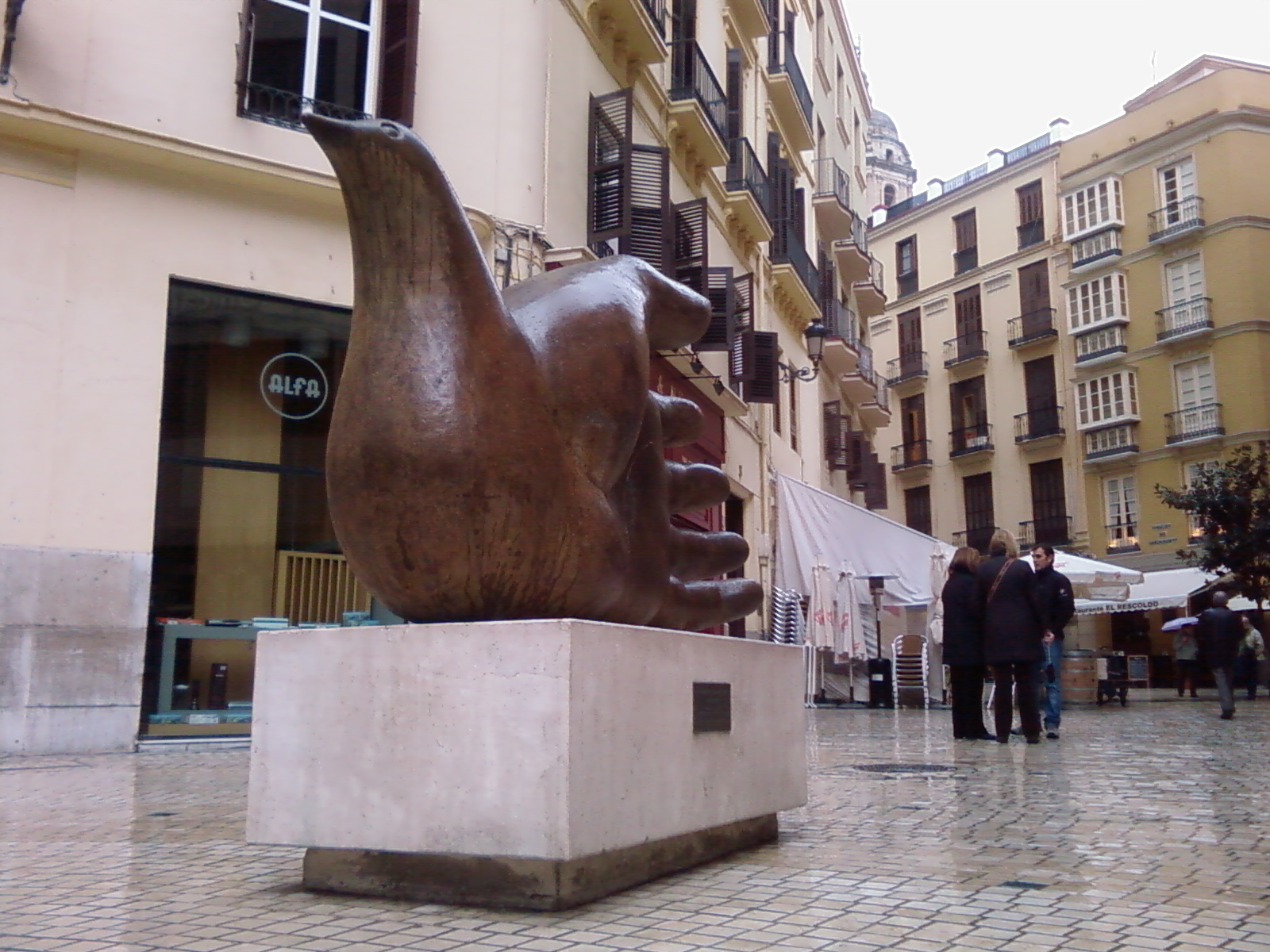
Ave Quiromántica, in Calle de la Bolsa, Málaga

Rafael Pérez Estrada (February 16, 1934 – May 22, 2000) was a Spanish poet and artist. He was one of the leading figures of avant-garde poetry and narrative in Spain. A several-time finalist for Spain's Premio Nacional de Literatura, Estrada published over forty books in his lifetime. Translations of Pérez Estrada have appeared in Harper's Bazaar and Poetry Daily. A book of selected poems, Devoured by the Moon, was published in February 2004.

The statue Ave Quiromántica by José Seguiri, based on a drawing by Estrada, stands in Calle de la Bolsa, Málaga.

== Life ==
Pérez Estrada was born in Málaga, Spain, on February 16, 1934. He studied law at the University of Granada and was a lawyer in his hometown. In 1959, he moved to Madrid, where he began writing professionally, contributing to magazines and radio stations. After returning to Málaga in 1960, he began writing more seriously. His first book, Valle de los galanes, a collection of plays, poetry, and narrative art, was published in 1968. He died on May 22, 2000.

== Works ==
- Breviario (1988)
- Libro de los Reyes (1990)
- Oficios del sueño (1992)
- Pequeño teatro (1998)
- El levitador y su vértigo (1999)
- La extranjera (1999)
- Poemas (2000)
- Cosmología esencial (2000)

== Poetry anthologies ==
- Antología 1968–1988 (1989)
- Informe desde el Sur (1989)
- Elecciones personales, una antología de urgencia (1996)
- El ladrón de atardeceres (1998)
- Rafael Pérez Estrada en la India (2009)
- Antología de breve ficción (2010)
- Un plural infinito (2011)
- Rafael Pérez Estrada. El demiurgo (2016)

== Anthologies edited ==
- Friso poético (Aproximación a Salvador Rueda y antología de su obra) (1985)
- Del goce y de la dicha (poesía erótica) (1985)
