= Personal mythology =

Concept in analytical psychology

Personal mythology refers to an individual's fundamental stories for making sense and meaning of the world. According to Dr. David Feinstein and Dr. Stanley Krippner, "A personal myth is a constellation of beliefs, feelings, images, and rules—operating largely outside of conscious awareness—that interprets sensations, constructs new explanations, and directs behavior. ...Personal myths speak to the broad concerns of identity (Who am I?), direction (Where am I going?), and purpose (Why am I going there?). For an internal system of images, narratives, and emotions to be called a personal myth, it must address at least one of the core concerns of human existence."

== Origin of the phrase in psychology ==
The term has its roots in the field of psychology (especially of the Jungian psychoanalytical school). It overlaps in some ways with Eric Berne's (1961) notion of "scripts," Albert Ellis' (1962) description of irrational belief systems, George Kelly's (1963) personal construct theory, Theodore Sarbin's (1986) emphasis on narrative psychology, and Mihaly Csikszentmihalyi's (1979) concept of "life themes."

In 1973, Rollo May remarked that "the underlying function of psychotherapy is the indirect reinterpretation and remolding of the patient's symbols and myths" (p. 342). And in 1975 he added, "The individual must define his or her own values according to personal myths...Authentic values for a given patient emerge out of the personal myth of that patient." According to May (1975), psychotherapy can best be described as the collaboration between therapist and patient in the adventure of exploring the patient's awareness of himself and others. "The person can then cultivate his own awareness of his personal myth, which will yield his values and identity as well as give him some shared basis for interpersonal relationships" (p. 706). McLeester (1976, p. 8) applied the concept to dream interpretation, stating, "In dreams we can discover our "personal myth." the story... underlying our daily lives." Ullman and Zimmerman (1979) applied the personal myth concept to dream interpretation, writing that it is the nature of dreams to expose and puncture dysfunctional myths while illuminating the self-deceptive strategies one uses to avoid initiating a more functional pattern of behavior.

In the early 1950s, Jacques Lacan introduced the notion of the individual myth in his lecture titled "The Neurotic's Individual Myth" which was then distributed in unofficial copy in 1953. The term "personal myth" was first introduced into the psychotherapeutic literature by Ernst Kris in 1956 to describe certain elusive dimensions of the human personality that he felt psychoanalysts need to consider if their attempts to bring about change were to be effective and lasting. Carl Jung (1963) began his autobiography, Memories, Dreams, Reflections by writing, "Thus it is that I have now undertaken, in my eighty-third year, to tell my personal myth".

In 1965 Arthur Warmoth wrote about the way certain memorable human experiences may become personal myths, fulfilling on a personal level functions that cultural myths have historically performed for entire societies. Warmoth's colleagues Sall Raspberry and Robert Greenway (1970) spoke of "the personal myths of one's dreams," observing that dreams and myths arise "from the same places... in the human psyche" (pp. 54–55). James Hillman (1971, p. 43) used the term in his psychological commentary on Gopi Krishna's autobiography.

== Popularization ==
Sam Keen was the first to popularize the concept of personal mythology for a general audience. He has written that "[t]o the best of my knowledge, the idea of personal mythology was born on November 4, 1964," the day Keen's father died and his personal quest for a meaningful mythic narrative was initiated. Starting in 1969, Keen gave seminars in the US and Europe on personal mythology. In 1971, he met Joseph Campbell, the comparative mythologist whose work brought national attention to the importance of mythology in contemporary society. Campbell's work, especially The Hero with a Thousand Faces and Creative Mythology, explored the role of personal myth-making in great depth. From 1971 to 1987, Keen and Campbell did seminars together "combining the methods of recovering personal mythology with reflection on classical mythical themes".

Meanwhile, since the early 1970s, David Feinstein has been operationalizing the "personal mythology" construct, having developed a five-stage model for teaching individuals to systematically examine, evaluate, and transform their guiding mythologies (Feinstein, 1979). Expanding on his study of the underlying mythic contents of forty-six systems of psychotherapy and personal growth (conducted at the Johns Hopkins School of Medicine), he has been advancing the term "personal mythology" in describing the individual's evolving construction of inner reality. Working with consciousness researcher Dr. Stanley Krippner, Feinstein and Krippner's 1988 book, Personal Mythology, guided readers through the program they developed in workshops taught throughout the world. Its 3rd edition was the U.S. Book News 2007 Psychology/Mental Health Book of the Year.

In 1990, Stephen Larson published The Mythic Imagination: The Quest for Meaning through Personal Mythology, further developing the idea.
