= Juan Roberto Diago Durruthy =

Cuban contemporary artist

Juan Roberto Diago Durruthy "Diago" (born 1971 in Havana) is an Afro-Cuban contemporary artist.

== Early life and education ==
Juan Roberto "Diago" Durruthy graduated at the Escuela Nacional de Bellas Artes "San Alejandro," Havana. Grandson of artist Roberto Juan Diago Querol, his grandmother was a First Violinist in the Havana Symphony Orchestra. Born in an intellectual background, he nevertheless lived his childhood in a poor neighborhood, el barrio Pogolotti.

== Work ==
His work is influenced by his own past, in which he confronts Cuban official racial narratives. He is interested in rewriting Caribbean histories as a way to include Transatlantic slave trade with the aim to highlight stories the country has tried to forget. He works with materials like calico in reference to what enslaved people used to wear while enduring slavery.

In 2020, the Lowe Art Museum, at University of Miami, presented a mid-career retrospective of his work.

His work is included in the collection of the Pérez Art Museum Miami, Florida.

== Exhibitions ==
- 1997 Venice Biennale, Venice, Italy.
- 1998 Galería La Acacia, Roberto Diago: Cuestiones, San Jose, La Habana, Cuba.
- 1999 Galerie Etats D'Art, L'avant-garde Cubaine à Paris, November 19 to December 11, Paris, France, (Prix Amédée Maratier).
- 1999 International Contemporary Art Fair (FIAC), Paris, France.
- 2000 Cernuda Arte, Calentando Motores / Heating up the Engines, group exhibition, Coral Gables, FL, USA.
- 2001 Cernuda Arte, Mi historia es tu historia / My history is your history, June - July, Coral Gables, FL, USA.
- 2001 Cernuda Arte, Veinticinco Artistas Cubanos de Aquí y de Allá, de Ayer y de Hoy, group exhibition Coral Gables, FL, USA.
- 2002 Yaco Garcia Arte Latino Americano, Galería Arteconsult, Juan Roberto Diago: Obras Recientes, March, 2002, Panama City, Panamá.
- 2002 Museo Nacional De Bellas Artes, Comiendo Cuchillo: Exposición de Juan Roberto Diago, June 6 to July 10, La Habana, Cuba.
- 2005 Pan American Art Gallery, Dallas, Texas, USA.
- 2006 Galería (e)spacio. Madrid, Spain.
- 2008 Galería El Torco. Cantabria, Spain
- 2010-12 Queloides: Race and Racism in Cuban Contemporary Art, Havana-Pittsburgh-New York City-Cambridge, MA, USA.
- 2013 Drapetomania: Grupo Antillano and the Art of Afro-Cuba, (Harvard University, Cambridge, MA; Museum of the African Diaspora, San Francisco, CA; 8th Floor Gallery, New York, NY, USA.)
- 2013 Centro de Arte Contemporáneo Wifredo Lam, La Habana, Cuba.
- 2014 Galería de la Biblioteca Pública Rubén Martínez Villena, La Habana, Cuba.
- 2014 Galería Tristá, Sobre mis pasos, Trinidad, Cuba.
- 2015 Panamerican Art Projects / Galerie Crone, Tracing Ashes, Berlin, Germany; Miami, FL, USA.
- 2016 Magnan Metz Gallery, Sobre mis pasos (Sur mes pas), New York, NY, USA.
- 2016 Vallois Galerie, Paris, France.
- 2017 Ethelbert Cooper Gallery of African American Art, Diago: The Pasts Of This Afro-Cuban Present, Harvard, February 2 to May 5, Cambridge, MA, USA.
- 2017 Venice Biennale, Cuban Pavilion, La Habana, Cuba.
- 2018 The Halsey Institute of Contemporary Art, Charleston, SC, USA.
- 2018 Kennedy Center installation (Artes de Cuba), Washington, D.C., USA.
- 2019 Lowe Museum at University of Miami, Diago: The Pasts of this Afro-Cuban Present, October 24 to January 19, 2020, Miami, FL, USA.

== Awards ==
- 1995: “Juan Francisco Elso” Prize (Académie des Beaux-Arts de Cuba)
- 1999: “ Amédée Maratier” Award (Fondation Kikoïne, Paris)
- 2000: “Abril 2000” Prize (UJC Nacional)

== External links / ==
- http://www.mariposa-arts.net/Artist.asp?ArtistID=41021&Akey=TJMS9E5St
- http://www.cubanartcollection.com/Artist.asp?ArtistID=24931&Akey=8V568XFL
