= Jesús Ferrero =

Spanish writer

Jesús Ferrero is a Spanish writer born in 1952 in the Spanish province of Zamora.

After completing his secondary education he studied literature in Zaragoza for a while and then moved to Paris to study ancient Greek history at the École des hautes études en sciences sociales.

Ferrero, like Javier Marías or Antonio Muñoz Molina, is a writer of that new Spanish prose which developed after La Movida Madrileña (Madriliene Movement), one of the early post-modern currents. He has written numerous novels, poetry collections, short stories, essays and screenplays. He is, among other things, co-author of Pedro Almodóvar's film Matador.

He is one of a group of well-known Spanish novelists, which includes Julio Llamazares, Javier Cercas, and Andrés Trapiello, who have published fiction in the vein of "historical memory", focusing on the Spanish Civil War and the Francoist State.

Ferrero's debut, Chinese-set novel Belver Yin (1981) was one of the most successful and critically acclaimed in post-Franco Spanish literature, and helped him to establish himself as one of the major writers of La Movida years. With novels set in Tibet (Opium, 1986), Barcelona (Lady Pepa, 1988) or Berlin (Débora Blenn, 1988), Ferrero continued during the 1980s a literary exploration characterized by eclectic intertextuality.

Fererro's book El Efecto Doppler (1990), follows a precise choreography which shows the protagonist, Darío, caught up in a complex tale. During an evening meal in Paris the young Rosaura blows her brains out in front of the diners: "Suddenly she looked at me and took a pistol from her bag. Without stopping her whistling she put the weapon to her temple." Every gesture, every look follows a kind of message, and Darío, Rosaura's cousin, takes it upon himself to create a meaningful entity from the seemingly unconnected clues. In calm, precise language and in a very detailed, cleverly devised structure Ferrero tells in his novel a gripping love story and at the same time makes us consider the limits of our perception.

Ferrero's precise language also appears in the novel El diablo en los ojos (1998). In which young Leo Salgado has been focusing his camera lens on his own family, he senses the great influence of this instrument which is able to record everyday trivialities and their most intimate facets. The camera in the story is the up-and-coming creative genius which captures, with almost cruel clarity, the disintegration of the family.

The action of Ferrero's novel, Juanelo o el hombre nuevo (2000), is set in Toledo in the 16th century. The protagonist in this fantasy-tale, a good-looking youth, gradually comes to discover the terrible history of his origin as he becomes more and more involved in events in Toledo. It becomes clear that he is an artificially created human being, a golem, a new kind of human being. The novel is a good example which again makes clear Ferrero's basic themes: "Destruction begins with the first tears in the cradle and ends when, in our parchment-like hands, time dies."

Ferrero's writing shows a rebirth of the old myths and also tells of the banal, sometimes absurd everyday stories. It reflects the utopias of the twentieth century like those of 'Metropolis'. Ferrero's style has been seen as close to that of Cervantes or Kafka. The author loves adopting classical narrative patterns while also modernizing and using them aesthetically with new stylistic features.

Since 1995 he has been living in Madrid where he teaches literature.

== List of major works ==
- Bélver Yin (Barcelona City Prize1981)
- Opium (1986)
- Río amarillo (Poesía. 1986)
- Lucrecia Temple: Encuentro en Berlín (libro de diálogos; 1987)
- Negro sol (Poetry. 1987)
- Lady Pepa (1988)
- Débora Blenn (1988)
- Ah, mira la gente solitaria (Poetry. 1988)
- El Efecto Doppler (Plaza y Janés Prize; 1990)
- La era de la niebla (1990)
- Alis el Salvaje (1991)
- Los reinos combatientes (1991)
- Pekín de la Ciudad Prohibida (1991)
- El secreto de los dioses (1993)
- Las veinte fugas de Básil (1995)
- Amador o la narración de un hombre afortunado (1996)
- Ulaluna (1997)
- El último banquete (Azorín Prize; 1997)
- El diablo en los ojos (1998)
- Juanelo o el hombre nuevo ( 2000)
- Zirze piernas largas (2002)
- Las Trece Rosas (2003; Fundación José Manuel Lara Prize, finalist 2004)
- Ángeles del abismo (2005).
- Las fuentes del Pacífico (2008)
- Las experiencias del deseo. Eros y misos (Anagrama Prize; 2009)
- Balada de las noches bravas (2010)
- El hijo de Brian Jones (2012)
- La noche se llama Olalla (2013)
- Doctor Zibelius (2014)
