= Pere Gimferrer =

Spanish poet, translator and novelist (born 1945)

The Most Excellent Pere Gimferrer
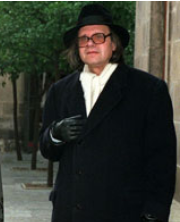
- Born: Pere Gimferrer Torrens; 22 June 1945 (age 81); Barcelona, Spain

Seat O of the Real Academia Española
- Incumbent
- Assumed office 15 December 1985 (Note: Elected on 18 April 1985)
- Preceded by: Vicente Aleixandre

Pere Gimferrer Torrens (Catalan pronunciation: [ˈpeɾə ʒimfəˈre]; born 22 June 1945) is a Spanish poet, translator and novelist. He is twice winner of Spain's Premio Nacional de Poesía (National Poetry Prize).

He was born in Barcelona in 1945. He writes both in Castilian and Catalan. In Castilian, he has written the poetry collections Arde el mar (1966, National Prize for Poetry), Amor en vilo (2006), Interludio azul (2006) and Tornado (2008). In Catalan, he has written the novel Fortuny (1983, Ramon Llull Novel Award and Critica Prize), and the poetry collection El vendaval (1988, National Poetry Prize). For lifetime achievement, he won the Premio Nacional de las Letras Españolas (National Prize for Spanish Literature) in 1998 and the International Octavio Paz Prize for Poetry and Criticism in 2006.

Gimferrer was elected to Seat O of the Real Academia Española on 18 April 1985, he took up his seat on 15 December the same year.
