= Rafael Soriano (painter) =

Cuban painter (1920–2015)

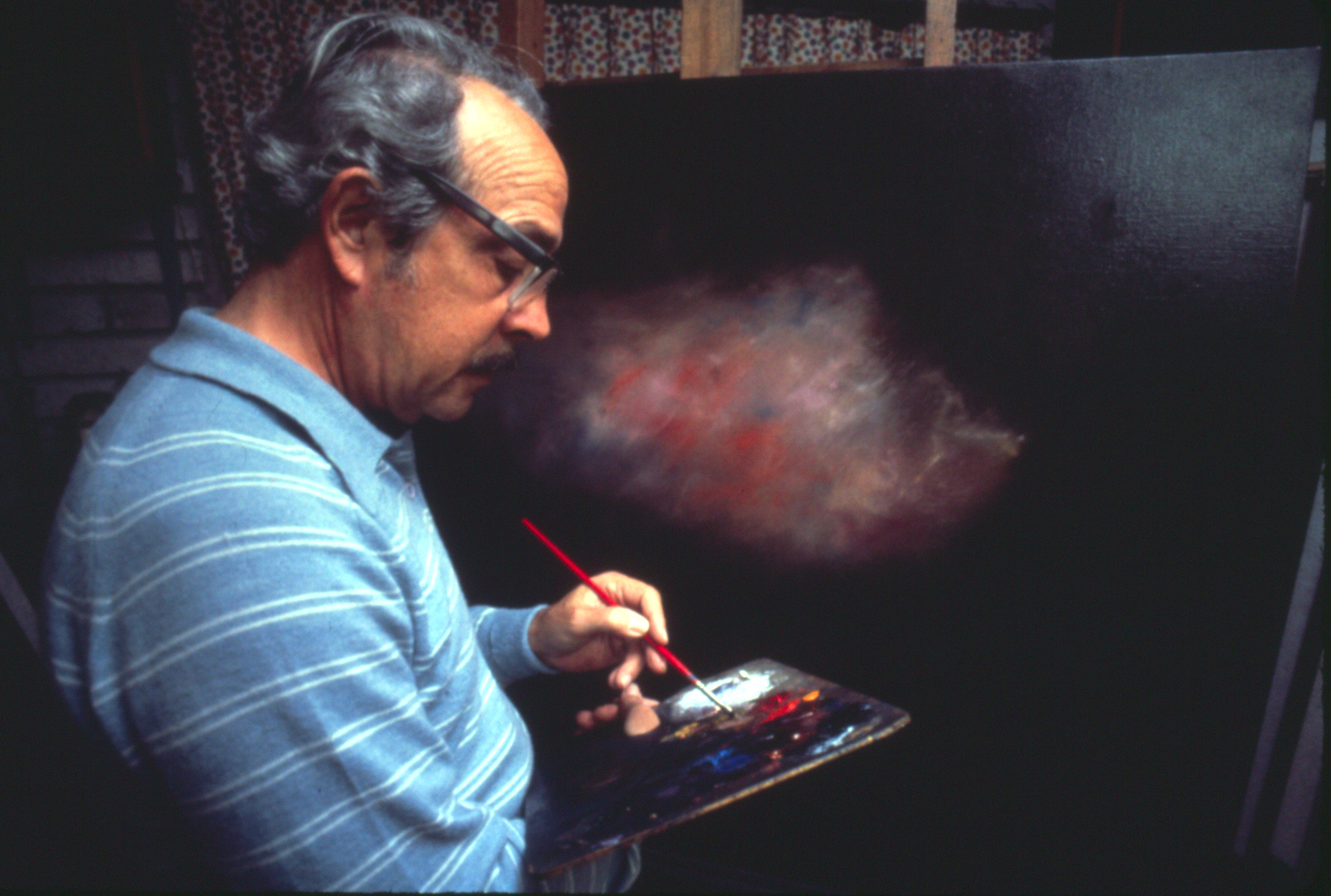
- Soriano in his studio in Miami in the 1980
- Born: November 23, 1920; Cidra, Matanzas Province, Cuba
- Died: April 9, 2015 (aged 94)
- Education: San Alejandro Art Academy, Havana
- Known for: Abstract painting; concrete art
- Notable work: Candor de la Alborada; Un Lugar Distante
- Style: Abstract art
- Movement: Concrete art
- Spouse: Milagros
- Children: Hortensia

Rafael Soriano (November 23, 1920 – April 9, 2015) was a Cuban painter who lived in the United States.

== Biography ==
Soriano was born on November 23, 1920, in Cidra, Matanzas Province, Cuba. He was studied at the San Alejandro Art Academy in Havana. During his studies, he met the critic José Gómez-Sicre and painters Víctor Manuel and Fidelio Ponce. With them he had a close friendship. He has started painting in 1940s, and soon became one of the primary practitioners of concrete art in Cuba and Latin America. In 1943, he became a professor. He left Cuba in 1962 and went to the United States with his wife, Milagros, and their daughter, Hortensia. In November 2008, the Miami Dade College West Campus in Doral, Florida hosted an Soriano exhibit titled Between the Mystic and the Spiritual.

== Rafael Soriano Foundation ==
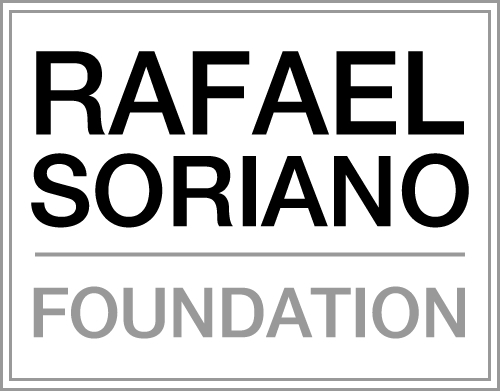

After Soriano's death in 2015, his family created the Rafael Soriano Foundation, to encourage a deeper appreciation of his artwork as one of the major Latin American Artist of his time. In particular, this Foundation promotes exhibitions that focus on his work to be placed in museums and collections around the globe. They also maintain a main database that catalogues all works made solely by Soriano.

Aside from their main purpose they have donated two major paintings to the Smithsonian Art Museum. Paintings donated include Candor de la Alborada(Candor of Dawn) 1994 and Un Lugar Distante(A Distant Place) 1972.

== Exhibitions ==
- "The Artist as Mystic" El Artista Como Mistico featured nearly a hundred paintings by Soriano as well as pastels and drawings also made by him. The theme was focused on his development as an artist by analyzing his early midway works such as his emigration where his style went through a change.
- October 2013 – May 2016 – The Smithsonian Museum featured it as part of its Latino Collection Artwork that explores how Latino Artist shaped the art movement of their time that influenced American art and culture.
- January 30 to June 4, 2017 – McMullen Museum of Art
- June 29 to October 1, 2017 – Long Beach Museum of Art
- October 23 to January 28, 2018 – Patricia and Phillip Frost Art Museum. The McMullen Museum of Art organized the exhibition, Boston College collaborated with the Rafael Soriano Foundation and was curated by Elizabeth Thompson Goizueta.
- August 30 to October 22, 2017 – Coral Gable Museum displayed the "Real and Imagined: Abstract Art” from CINTAS that explored the art abstraction alongside other artists such as Mario Carreno, Jose Mijares, etc.
