= Carrer de Pujades, Barcelona =

Street in Barcelona, Catalonia, Spain

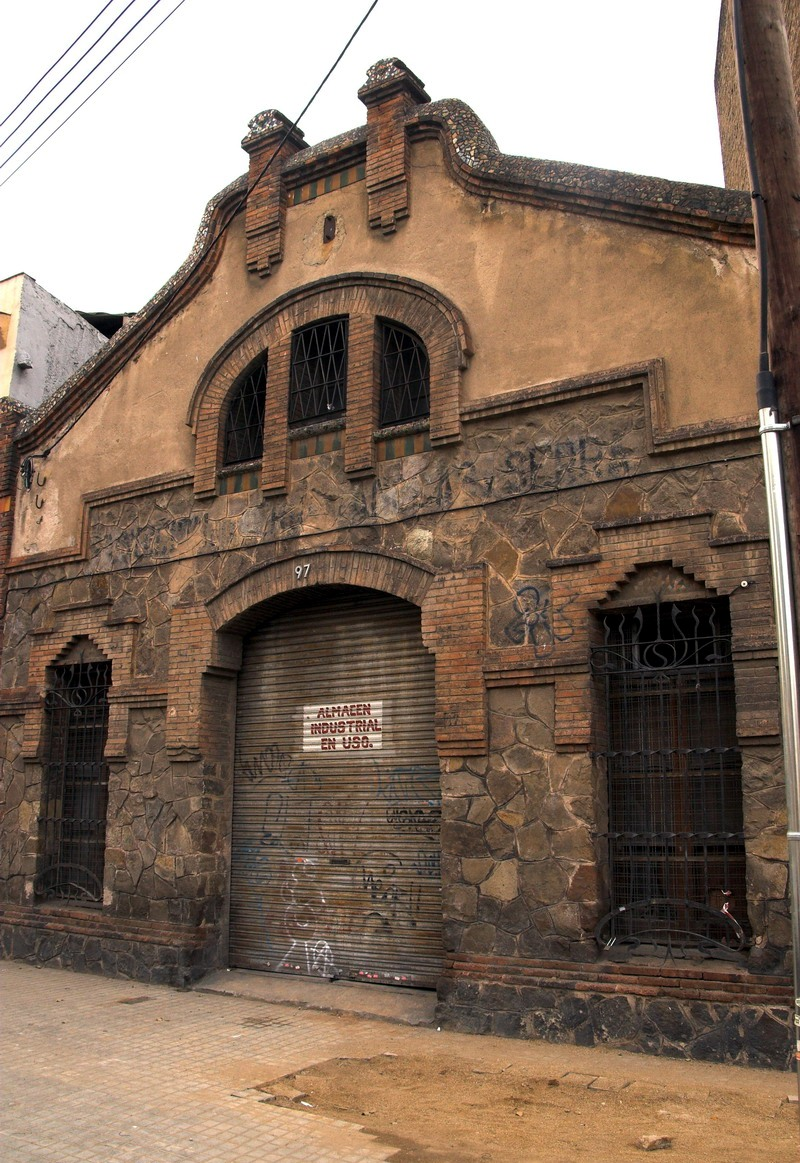
An example of Poblenou's fading industrial heritage. This warehouse was designed by Joaquim Raspall.

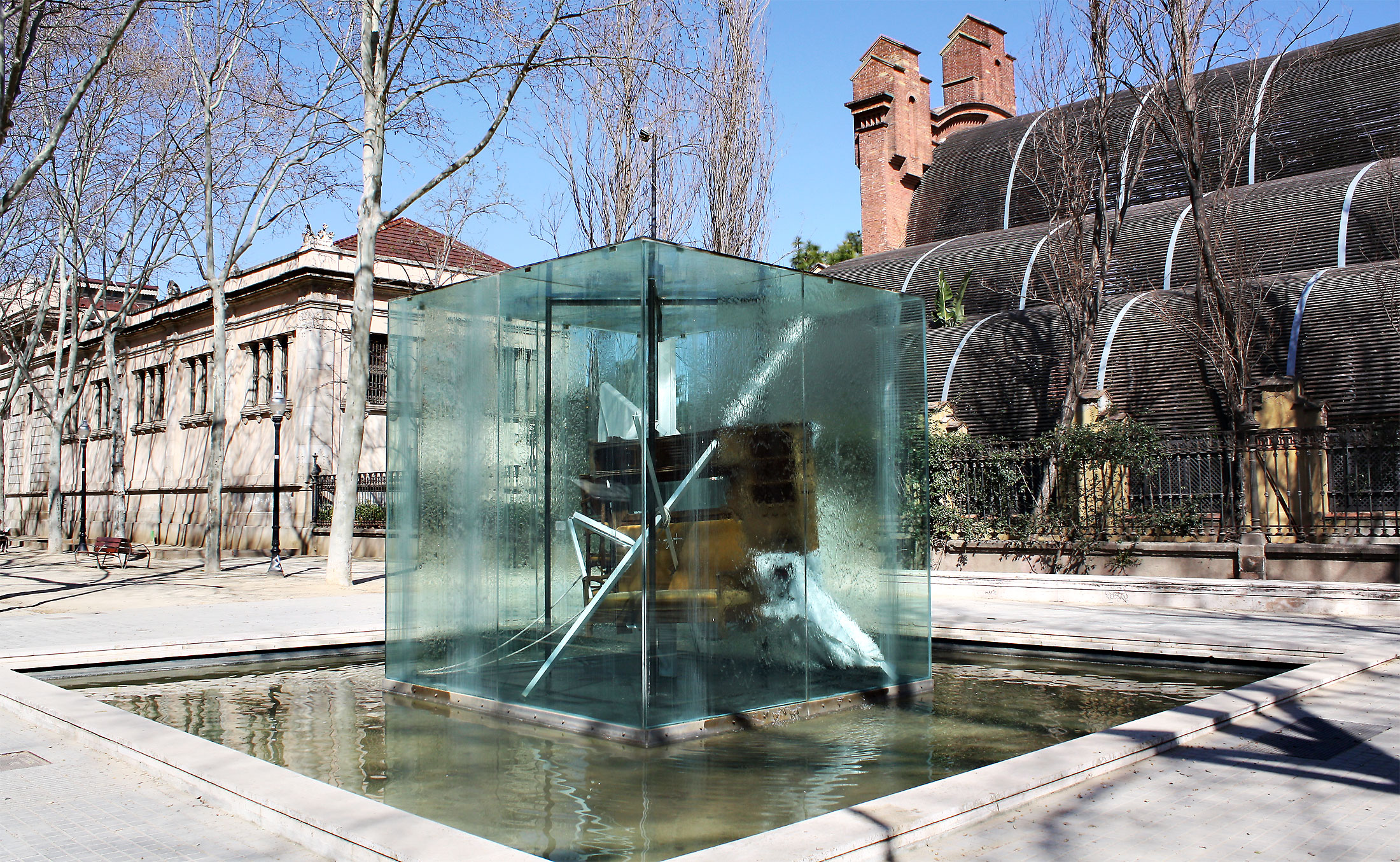
Hommage a Picasso de Antonio Tàpies en el Passeig de Picasso

Carrer de Pujades and Passeig de Pujades, before 1900 rendered Pujadas, are respectively a street and a promenade in the Poblenou and Sant Martí de Provençals areas of Barcelona (Catalonia, Spain). It's named after the poet and historian Jeroni Pujades, who penned a Universal Chronicle of the Principality of Catalonia in the 16th century. In Ildefons Cerdà's urban plan the street was to be named U street. It starts by Passeig de Picasso and Passeig de Lluís Companys, and runs to the north-east of Poblenou, at Carrer de la Selva de Mar, near Avinguda Diagonal. It borders one of Barcelona's biggest parks, Parc de la Ciutadella and crosses the city's new development district, 22@. Some 19th-century and early-20th-century industrial architecture is still to be found in the area, along with late-20th-century developments, despite their being replaced by newer structures and office buildings.

In 2018, a new hotel was built in Passeig de Pujades by the German hotel group, Motel One.

== Transportation ==
Barcelona Metro stations Bogatell, Llacuna, Poblenou and Selva de Mar, all of which are located along Carrer de Pujades and are served by L4.

== See also ==
- Parc de la Ciutadella
- 22@
- Urban regeneration
- 2004 Universal Forum of Cultures
