= ShopRepublic =

ShopRepublic is a web portal that collects, organizes and publishes deals, discounts and coupon codes from international online stores.

The portal was launched in March 2011 by the company Projects Unlimited S.L., founded by Angels Sastre and Giuseppe Perri, based in the Barcelona area, Spain. Annoyed by the lack of 24/7 shops in their country and following the smart shopping experience, they focused on building the first website that offers cross-border shop information and discounts. They believe today's online shoppers are overwhelmed by irrelevant promotional contents not suited to their personal preferences and their goal is to deliver all promotions in a unique message according to user's interests.

ShopRepublic portal is available in English, German, Spanish, Swedish and Dutch. Its search function allows users to browse by discounts, category, shop name or item. There are five major categories for discounts: health and beauty, clothing and accessories, travel, computer and electronics and books, music and movies. On a related blog the authors present trending or seasonal items and shops. Competitors and similar sites include RetailMeNot, Coupon Mountain, Savings.com, and Groupalia.

ShopRepublic also uses the social shopping experience. Once customers enter the platform, they can start uploading and sharing discounts or reviewing shops and gradually earn points and badges. As they become more savvy, users can access exclusive discounts, gift cards and privileges.
