= Kimchi and Chips =

Seoul-based media art duo

Kimchi and Chips is a Seoul-based media art duo formed in 2009 by South Korean artist Mimi Son and British artist Elliot Woods. Their installations combine projection, optical systems, computation, and physical materials to create images and light effects in three-dimensional space. Their works include the Light Barrier series, 483 Lines, Halo, Another Moon, Unread Characters, Optical Rail, and Reworld.

Another Moon at Llum BCN in Barcelona in 2023

== History and practice ==
Mimi Son and Elliot Woods founded Kimchi and Chips in Seoul in 2009. Son is a South Korean artist born in Seoul. Woods is a British artist from Manchester who studied physics at the University of Manchester and works with computer vision, machine learning, and robotics.

Their early works combined physical structures with interactive and projection-based systems. Link (2010) consisted of a city-like structure made from 400 cardboard boxes onto which videos recorded by visitors were projected. The interactive installation Lit Tree (2011) used two projectors and real-time tracking to turn the leaves of a tree into three-dimensional pixels. Hand gestures detected by a sensor were translated into light patterns projected onto the tree.

The duo subsequently developed installations centered on the construction of images in physical space rather than on conventional screens. Their Light Barrier series uses projectors, mirrors, and haze to make intersecting beams of light visible as three-dimensional forms. The first version used scanning and convex mirrors, while later versions expanded the technique through arrays of individually calibrated concave mirrors and projectors.

Light Barrier 3rd Edition (2016), commissioned by the Asia Culture Center in Gwangju, divided the output of eight video projectors into 630 sub-projections using an array of concave mirrors, producing spatial images in haze. The work received an Award of Distinction in the Computer Animation / Film / VFX category of the Prix Ars Electronica in 2017.

Their work has been presented at institutions and festivals including the National Museum of Modern and Contemporary Art in Seoul, ZKM Center for Art and Media Karlsruhe, Ars Electronica in Linz, Somerset House in London, the Asia Culture Center in Gwangju, and the Onassis Foundation in Athens.

== Selected works ==
Halo at Somerset House in London in 2018

- Link (2010) – An interactive installation consisting of a cityscape made from 400 cardboard boxes. Visitors recorded videos at kiosks that were subsequently projected onto individual boxes throughout the installation.
- Light Barrier (2014–) – A series of installations using calibrated projections, mirrors, and haze to produce visible three-dimensional forms from intersecting beams of light. The original work received a Jury Selection in the Art Division of the 18th Japan Media Arts Festival.
- 483 Lines (2014) – An installation commissioned by the Jeju Museum of Art in which video was projected onto 483 parallel nylon threads spanning the gallery. The number referred to the visible scan lines used to construct images in the analogue NTSC television system. A second edition, using Kevlar rope, was commissioned by the Asia Culture Center in 2015.
- Lunar Surface (2014) – A light-painting project in which a moving fabric surface was tracked with a 3D camera while a projector adjusted an image of the moon to its changing shape. Long-exposure photography recorded the projected image as a floating lunar form. A later version was installed in 2015 in a former incineration plant in Bucheon, South Korea.
- Halo (2018) – An outdoor installation presented at Somerset House in London. Motorized mirrors tracked the sun and reflected sunlight through a cloud of water mist, producing a circular image suspended in the air. The work was co-commissioned by the Arts Council Korea and Arts Council England Joint Fund and the 2017 Gwangju Design Biennale, and presented by Somerset House with the Korean Cultural Centre UK.
- Another Moon (2021–) – A large-scale outdoor installation in which an array of laser projectors creates the appearance of a second moon in the sky. Solar panels collect energy during the day and power the projectors at night. The work was first presented at the NEW NOW Festival at Zeche Zollverein in Essen in 2021. It was subsequently presented in Athens in 2022, at Llum BCN in Barcelona in 2023, and at the National Museum of Modern and Contemporary Art in Seoul in 2024. It received an Honorary Mention in the Interactive Art+ category of the Prix Ars Electronica in 2022.
- Unread Characters (2023–) – A series of optical installations in which written characters appear and change as viewers move. Early versions incorporated the endangered Afaka syllabary. A later version at Gallery Shilla used a machine-learning model trained on Mimi Son's handwritten copy of Yi Sang's Crow's Eye View, with the resulting patterns viewed through arrays of lenses.
- Optical Rail (2023) – An opto-kinetic series in which motorized lenses move across back-lit static images, creating apparent motion and optical distortion without a conventional moving-image display.
- Reworld (2023) – A pavilion presented at the 4th Seoul Biennale of Architecture and Urbanism. The installation used movable optical elements and an AI image generator to refract and recombine views of the surrounding city into mosaic-like images imagining future versions of Seoul.

== Awards and recognition ==
- 2014 – Winner, Spatial Media Art, Media Architecture Biennale, for Light Barrier
- 2015 – Honorary Mention, Hybrid Art, Prix Ars Electronica, for Light Barrier
- 2017 – Award of Distinction, Computer Animation / Film / VFX, Prix Ars Electronica, for Light Barrier 3rd Edition
- 2022 – Honorary Mention, Interactive Art+, Prix Ars Electronica, for Another Moon
