= Bogatell station =

Barcelona Metro station

Coordinates: 41.395°N 2.191°E

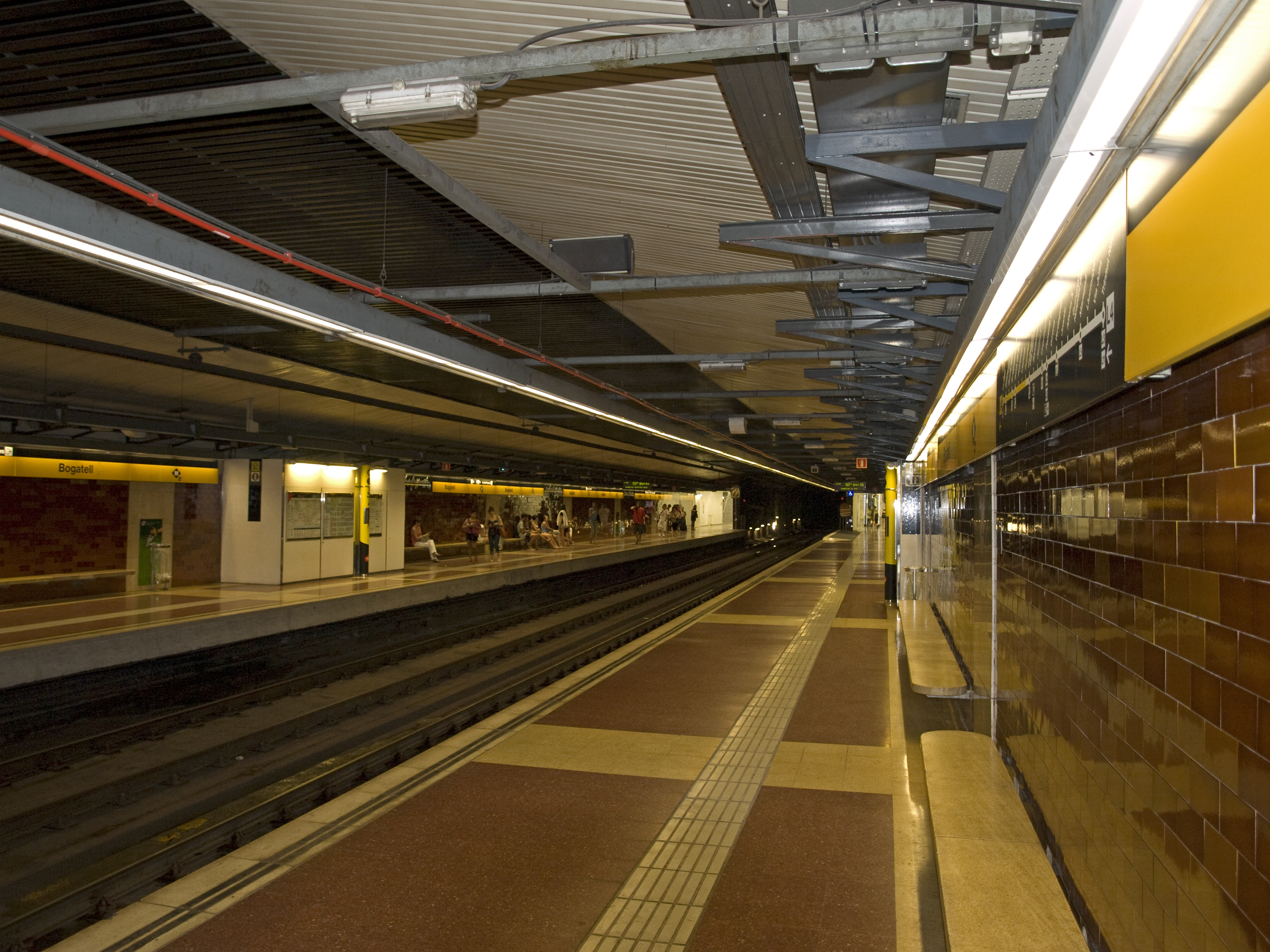
The station's platforms.

Bogatell (Catalan pronunciation: [buɣəˈteʎ]) is a Barcelona Metro station located in the Bogatell neighbourhood in the district of Sant Martí, Barcelona. The station is served by L4 (yellow line).

It was opened in 1977 (49 years ago), under the name Pedro IV, with the extension of the line from Barceloneta to Selva de Mar, and adopted its current name in 1982. The station is located under Carrer de Pujades between Carrer de Zamora and Carrer de Pamplona. It can be accessed from both Carrer de Pujades and Carrer de Pere IV. There is a Bicing station nearby.

== Services ==
Preceding station	Metro	Following station
Ciutadella | Vila Olímpica towards Trinitat Nova	L4	Llacuna towards La Pau

== See also ==
- 22@
