= Poblenou station =

Metro station in Barcelona, Spain

Coordinates: 41°24′11″N 2°12′10″E

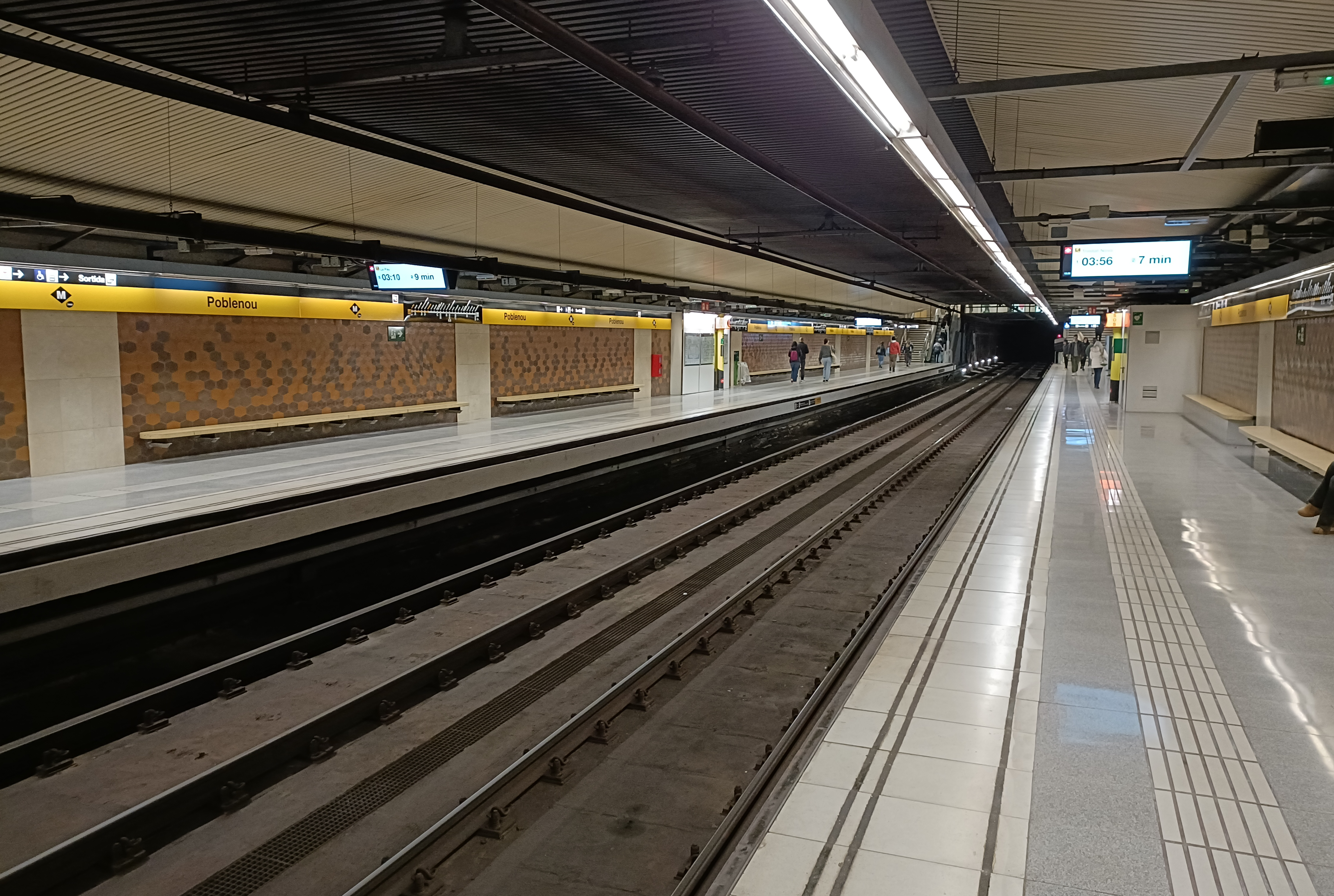
The platform at Poblenou metro station

Poblenou (Catalan pronunciation: [ˌpɔbːləˈnɔw]) is a Barcelona Metro station in Poblenou, a formerly industrial area of Barcelona's Sant Martí district. The location of the station is in the intersections of Carrer de Pujades with carrer de Bilbao and carrer de Lope de Vega.

It's served by L4 (yellow line). It was opened in 1977 (49 years ago) along with the lines from Barceloneta to Selva de Mar. The platforms are 93 m (305 ft) long.

== Services ==
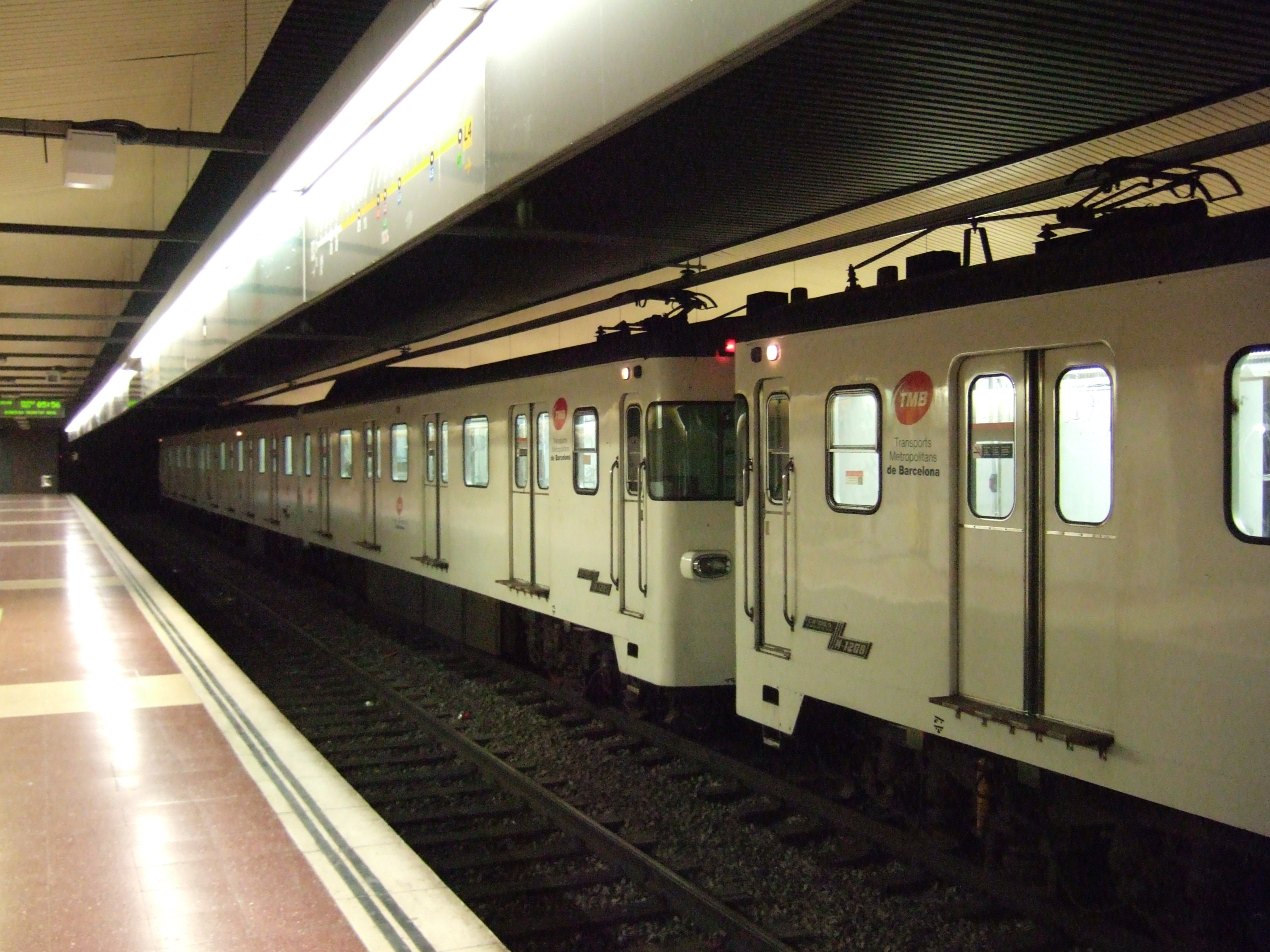
A 1000 series trains at the station, 2006

Preceding station	Metro	Following station
Llacuna towards Trinitat Nova	L4	Selva de Mar towards La Pau

== See also ==
- List of Barcelona Metro stations
