= El Poblenou =

Coordinates: 41°23′57″N 2°12′14″E

- Neighbourhood of Barcelona
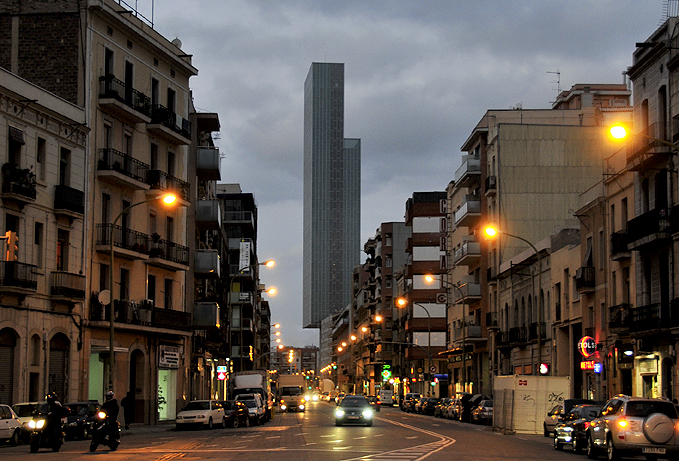
- View of Carrer Pere IV in Poblenou, with Dominique Perrault's Hotel Meliá Barcelona Sky in the centre.
- Interactive map of El Poblenou
- Country: Spain
- Autonomous Community: Catalonia
- Province: Barcelona
- Comarca: Barcelonès
- Municipality: Barcelona
- District: Sant Martí

Area
  - Total: 1.545 km^{2} (0.597 sq mi)

Population
  - Total: 34,151
  - Density: 22,100/km^{2} (57,250/sq mi)
- Demonym(s): poblenoví, -ina

El Poblenou (pronounced [əl ˌpɔbːləˈnɔw]; Catalan for 'The New Village') is an extensive neighborhood of Barcelona’s Sant Martí district that borders the Mediterranean Sea to the south, Sant Adrià del Besòs to the east, Parc de la Ciutadella in Ciutat Vella to the west, and Sant Andreu to the north. Originally, it was a town entirely separate from Barcelona proper.

== History ==
During the Industrial Revolution of the 19th century, Poblenou was the epicenter of Catalan and Iberian industry, earning it its sobriquet of the Catalan Manchester. Surrounding the extensive cluster of factories stood mostly working-class residential areas. When the industrial buzz passed, the neighborhood fell into a state of abandon and after a period of decay, the neighborhood underwent a dramatic transformation. The Olympic Games in 1992 were the main trigger for this massive transformation of El Poblenou. Many of the areas that have been developed — including the Vila Olímpica, the Diagonal Mar area, and the Fòrum area — arguably comprise their own neighborhoods. Completing its original, unfinished plan, The Avinguda Diagonal now stretches from Plaça de les Glòries to the sea. The massive 22@ plan is set to convert Poblenou into the city's technological and innovation district, as well as to increase leisure and residential spaces.

Alongside the newly built, upscale Vila Olímpica and Diagonal Mar areas, many artists and young professionals have converted the former factories and warehouses into lofts, galleries, and shops. Art & Design schools and studios have also opened, making the area known for its creative outlook.

Some of the old factory buildings are now declared historic monuments and are under protection. This is the case of the Factory Hispania SA, built by the Cuban-German merchant Emilio Heydrich, and architect Josep Graner in 1923, or the Valls, Teixidor i Jordana chemical factory.

The leafy Rambla del Poblenou, which stretches from Avinguda Diagonal to the beach, is the main commercial street.

== Life in El Poblenou ==
El Poblenou lies between the beaches of Barcelona and city center. Due to its rising popularity, prices of flats in the area have increased dramatically. Besides beaches, this neighborhood offers open spaces, green parks and relatively few tourists. Despite local efforts to maintain authenticity, La Rambla de Poblenou is battling the effects of gentrification and mass tourism.

The annual light art festival Llum BCN is celebrated since 2012 every February in Poblenou.

== Landmarks ==
Notable buildings of Poblenou include the Torre Agbar (Jean Nouvel), Herzog & de Meuron's Forum Building (which houses Europe's largest scale model of a city), and the ME Barcelona Hotel (former Habitat Sky Hotel) (Dominique Perrault). Major public spaces include the Parc de Diagonal Mar (Enric Miralles), the Plaça de les Glòries Catalanes, the Parc Central del Poblenou (Jean Nouvel), the beachfront Parc del Poblenou, the vast Parc del Forum, Oficines Diagonal 197 (David Chipperfield), the Media-Tic Building (Enric Ruiz Geli - CLOUD 9), the historic Poblenou Cemetery as well as many kilometres of beaches.

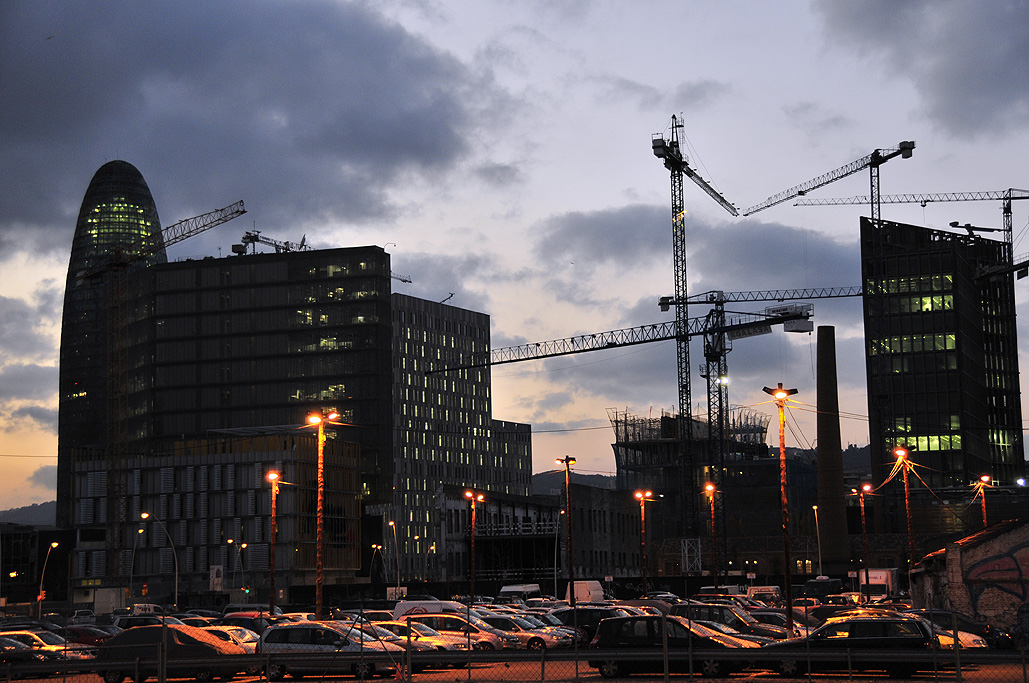
View of construction in Poblenou, Barcelona, resulting from the 22@ urban renewal plan.

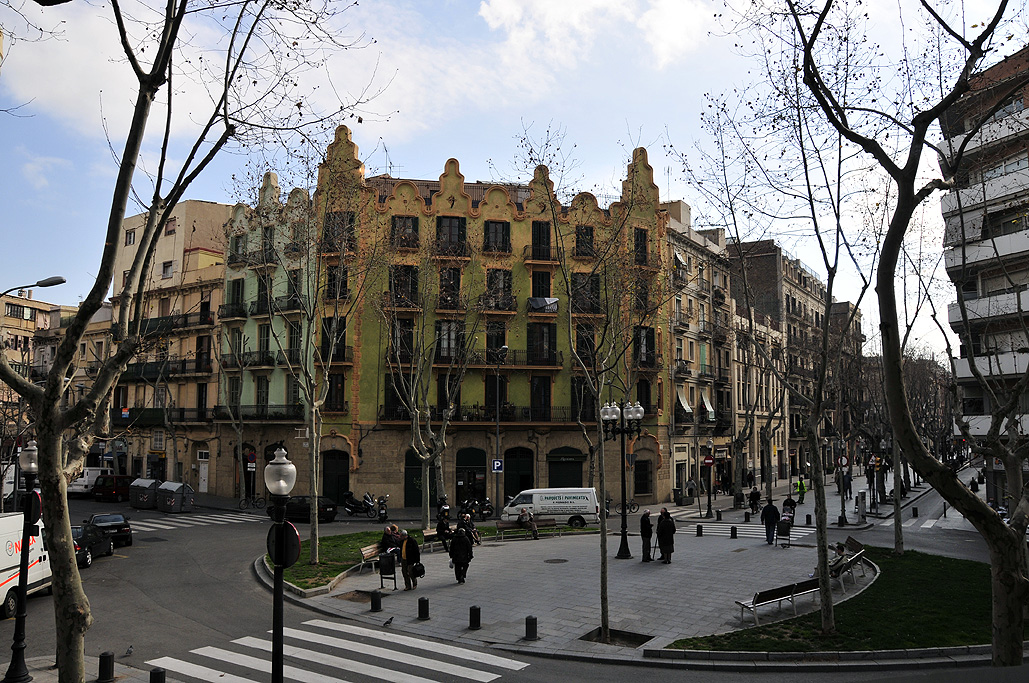
Modernista building on a corner of Rambla del Poblenou (Barcelona).

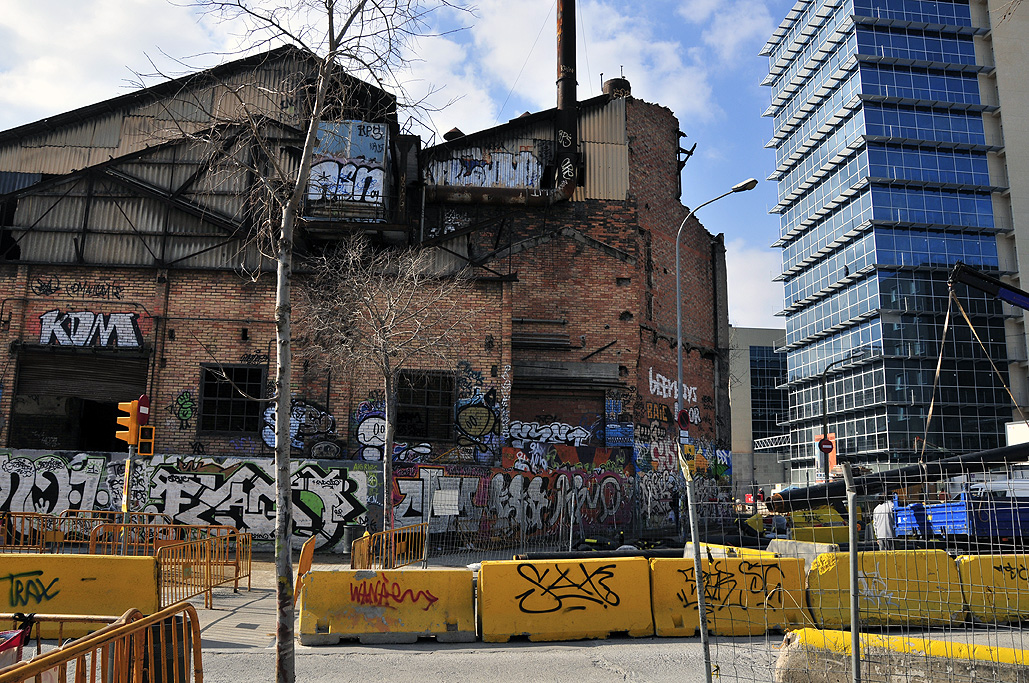
View of Carrer Pallars in Poblenou, showing renovation of underground infrastructure, as well as one of many former factories next to a modern building.

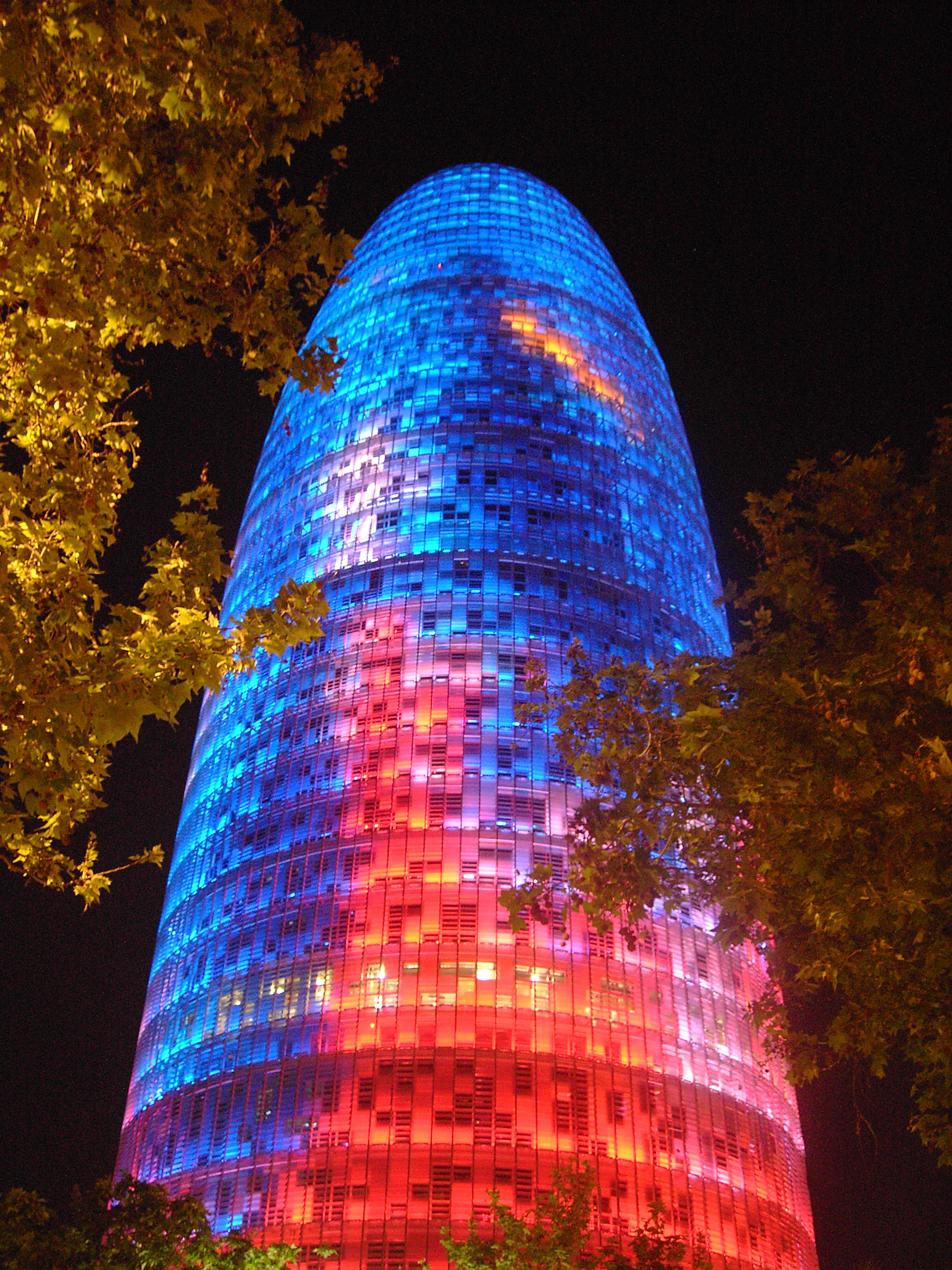
Torre Agbar.

== Public transport ==
- Barcelona Metro line 1 stations: Marina, Glòries
- Barcelona Metro line 4 stations: Selva de Mar, Poblenou, Llacuna, Bogatell
- Trambesòs stations: Glòries, Ca l'Aranyó, Pere IV, Fluvià

== See also ==
- Primavera Sound Festival
- 2004 Universal Forum of Cultures
