= Llacuna station =

Metro station in Barcelona, Spain

Coordinates: 41°23′56″N 2°11′50″E

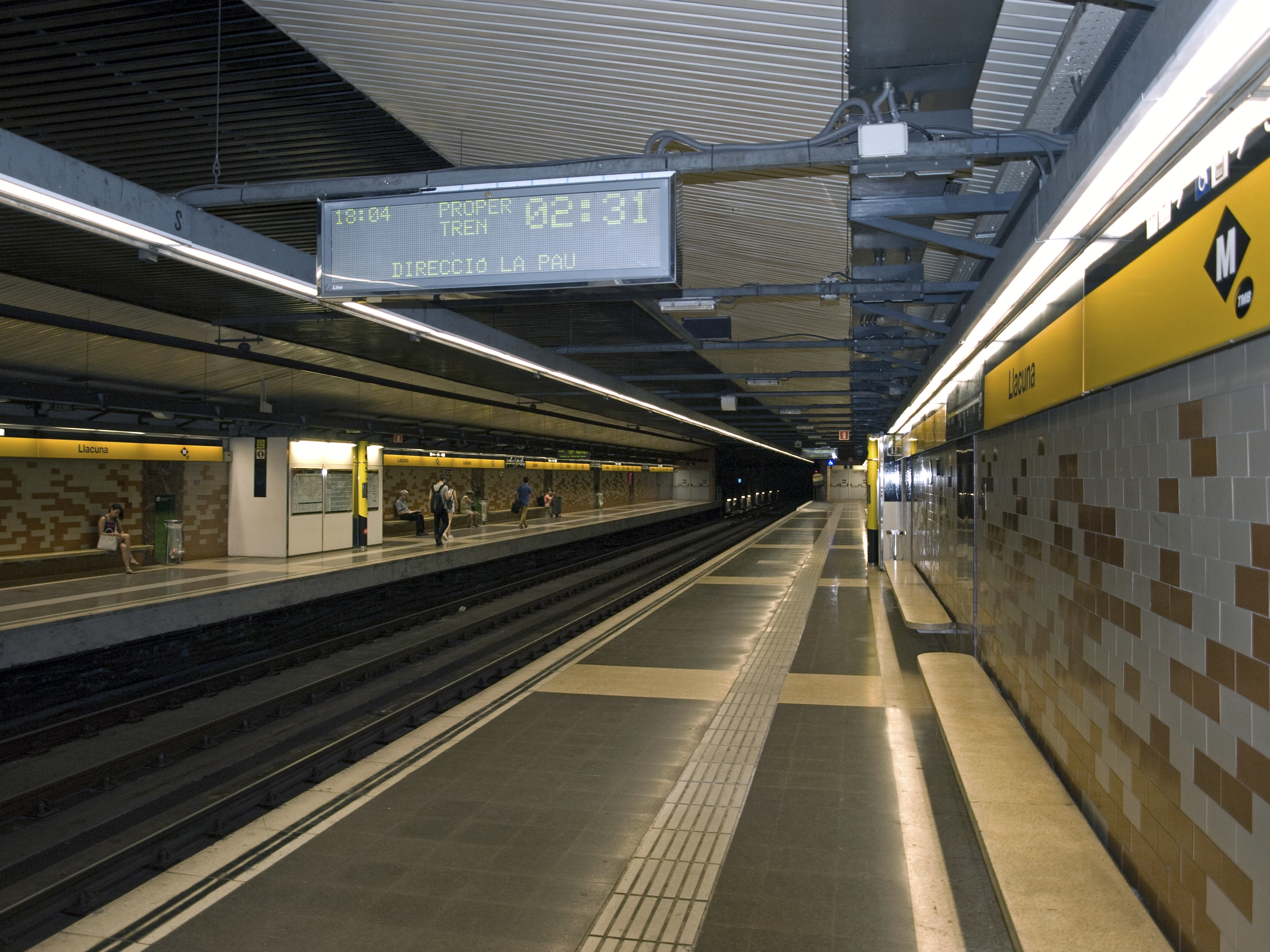
The platforms

Llacuna (Catalan pronunciation: [ʎəˈkunə]) is a Barcelona Metro station in the Poblenou neighbourhood of Barcelona, in the Sant Martí district, located under Carrer de Pujades between Carrer Ciutat de Granada and Carrer de Roc Boronat. It's served by L4 (yellow line). The station was inaugurated in 1977 (49 years ago).

== Services ==
Preceding station	Metro	Following station
Bogatell towards Trinitat Nova	L4	Poblenou towards La Pau

== See also ==
- List of Barcelona Metro stations
