= Llum BCN =

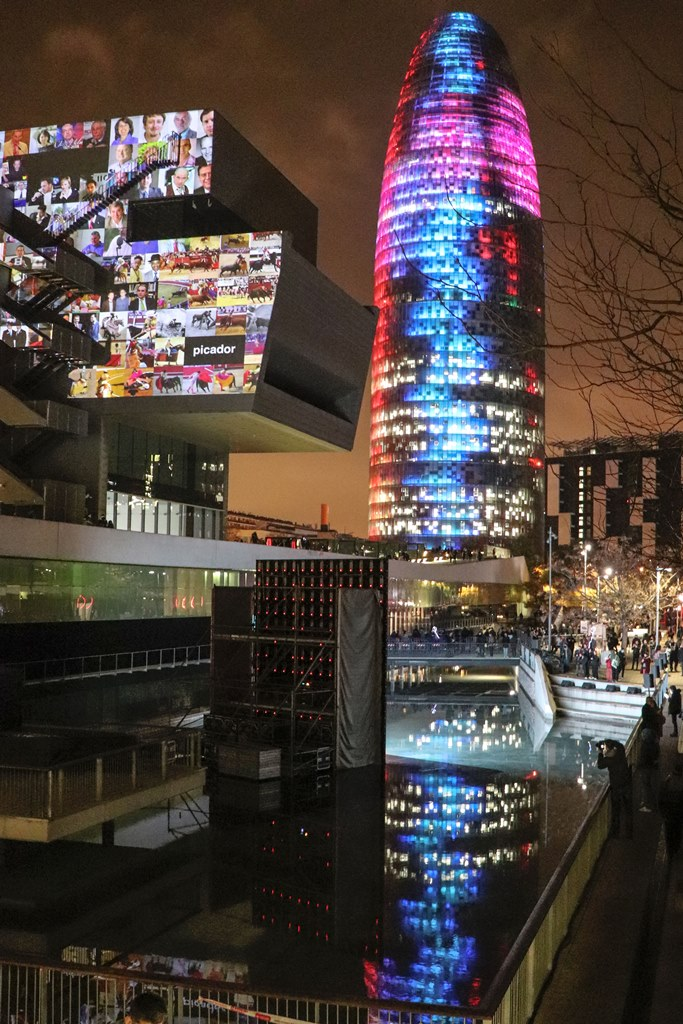
- Llum BCN 2022: Trevor Paglen, Faces of ImageNet and ProtoPixel, Mix & Match
- Genre: Exhibition
- Begins: February
- Ends: February
- Frequency: Annual
- Location: Barcelona
- Inaugurated: 2012
- Website: www.barcelona.cat/llumbcn/en/

Llum BCN is an annual light arts festival held in Barcelona, Spain. It is celebrated since 2012 every February in Barcelona's neighborhood Poblenou. It features a series of light installations and shows.

== Concept ==
Llum BCN, Light Barcelona in English, extends across various key points in the Poblenou neighborhood, starting at the Design Museum of Barcelona at Plaça de les Glòries Catalanes. The installations are spread across the neighborhood and are visible from nightfall until midnight. The 2024 festival edition expands with a new axis, including spaces such as the Teatre Nacional de Catalunya, L'Auditori, and the Encants market.

Large historic buildings, old factory chimneys and industrial plants, but also the modern Torre Glòries are illuminated by large-scale projections and audio-visual displays in the Poblenou neighborhood. Many of the festival's light displays include the use of technology such as virtual reality and AI.

== Artists ==
Llum BCN has featured artists such as Rafael Lozano-Hemmer, Julio Le Parc, Luke Jerram, Ulf Langheinrich, United Visual Artists, Kurt Hentschlager, Trevor Paglen, Chila Kumari Burman, Vera Molnár and Catalonia's Antoni Arola as well as local schools of art, design, illumination, and architecture.

The 2025 edition includes an AI installation of Joan Fontcuberta about the verses of the Book of Genesis, generating virtual landscapes from the emergence of light and darkness via the landscapes of the Garden of Eden to the destruction of Gaza. A robotic voice recites the verses in several languages.

== Gallery ==
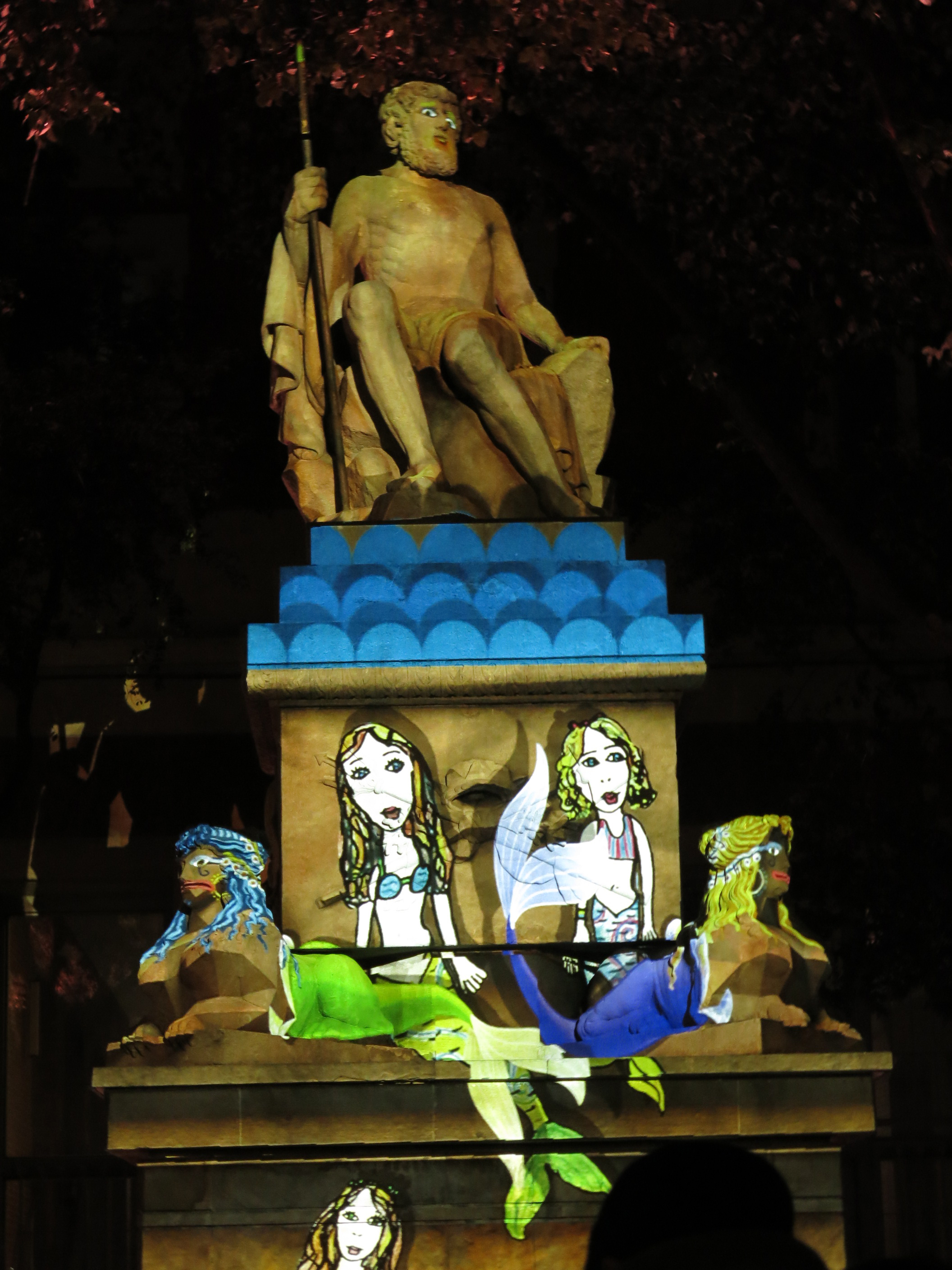
Llum BCN 2015

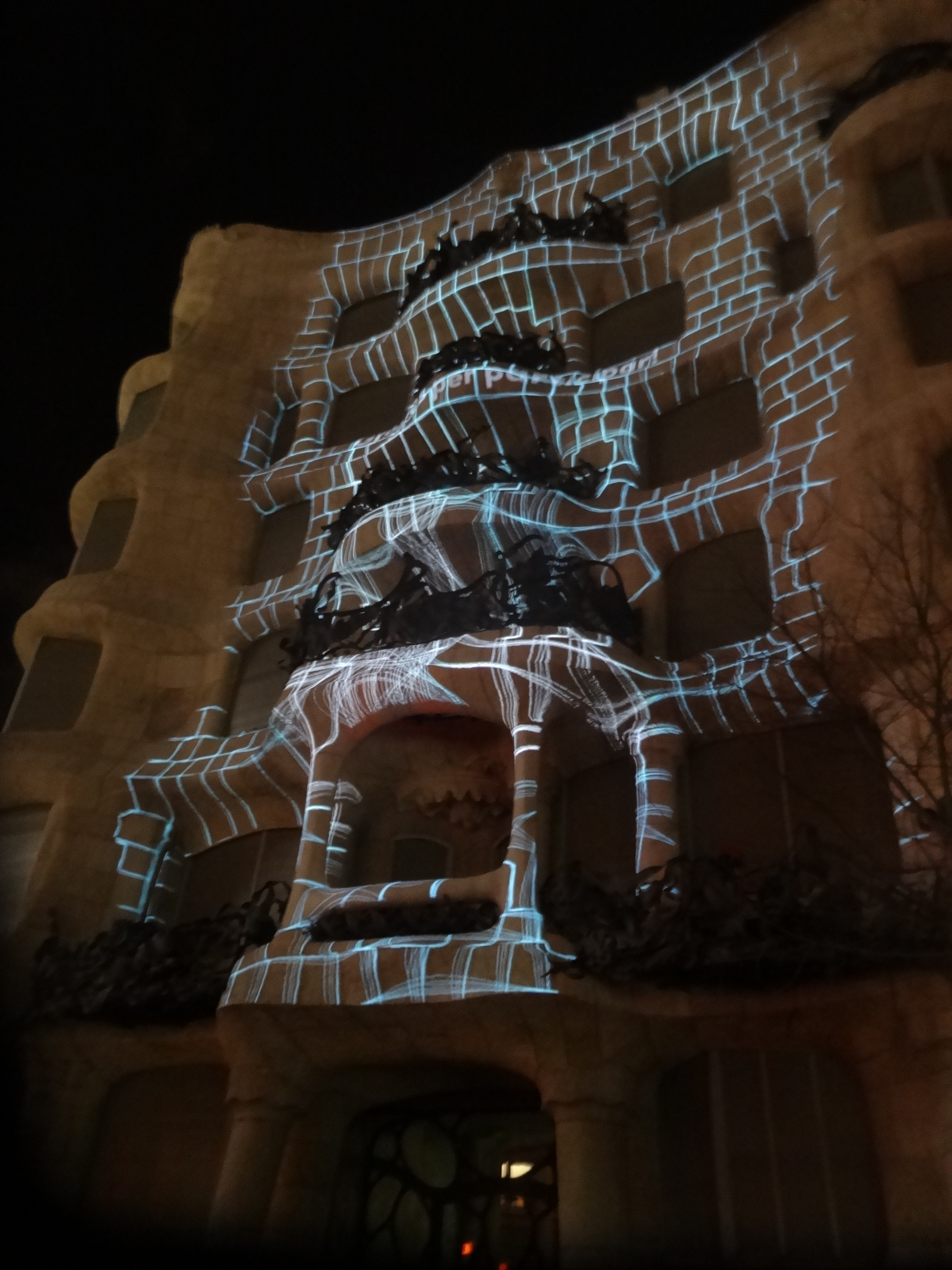
Llum BCN 2016

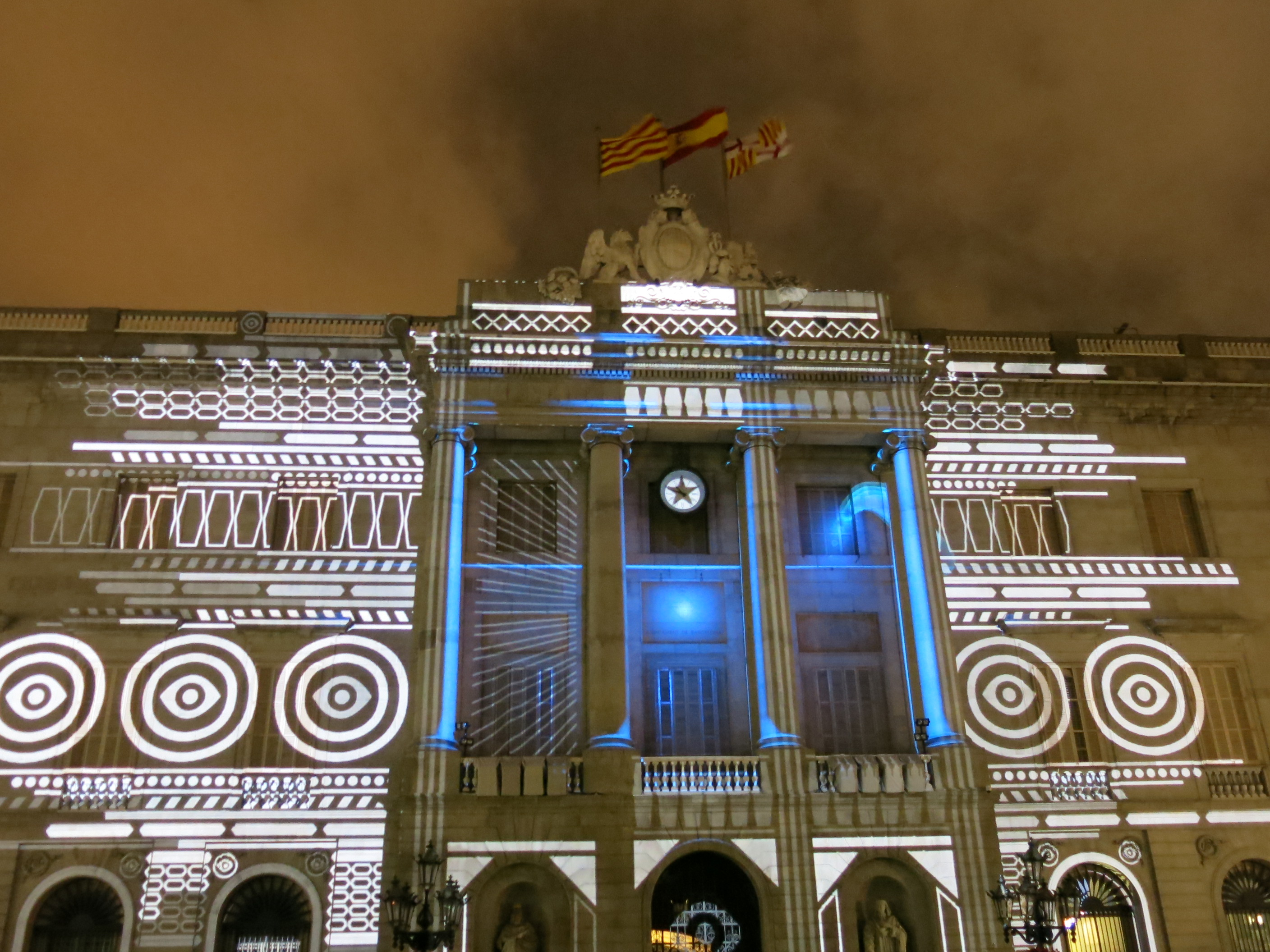
Llum BCN 2017

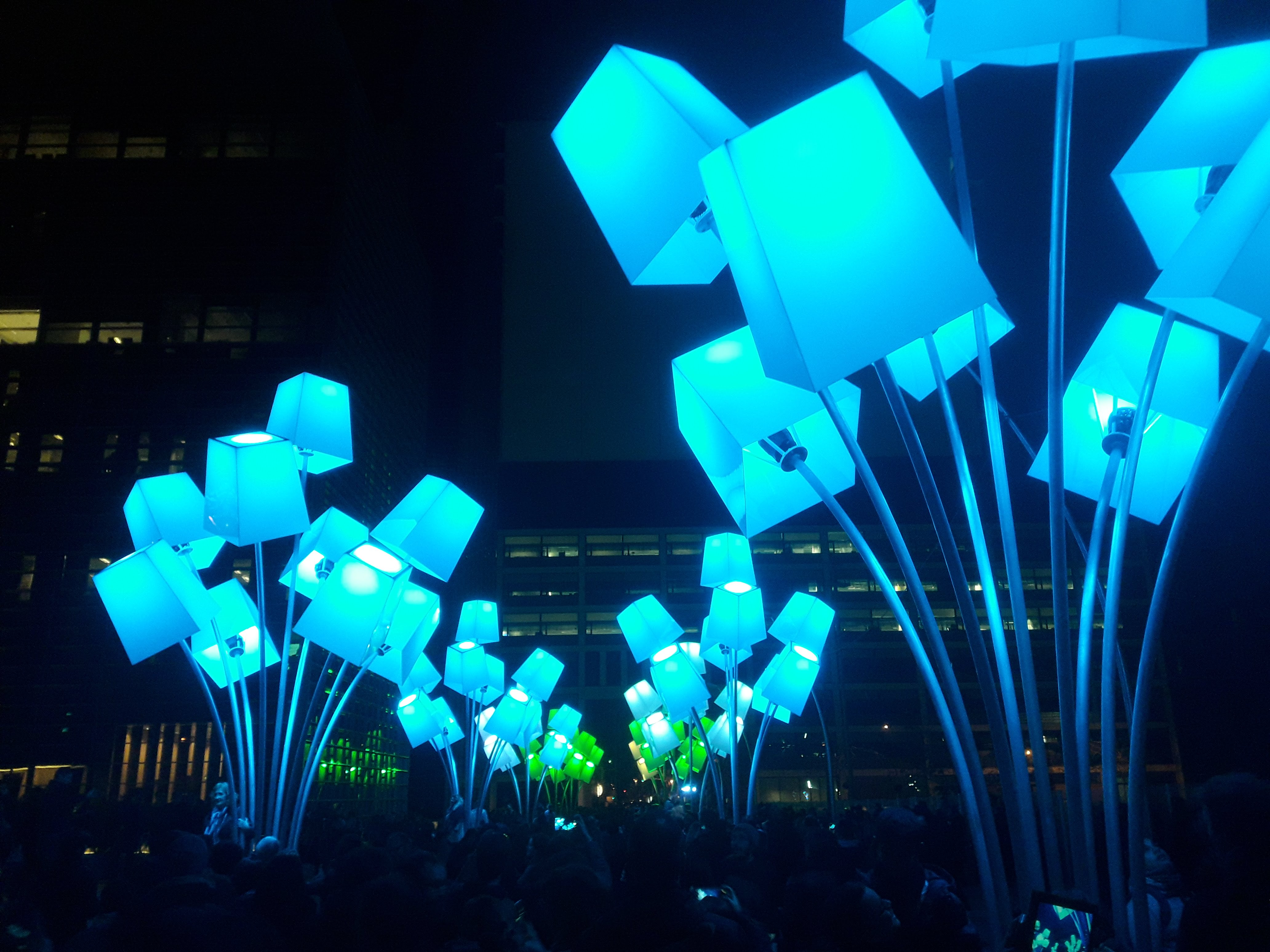
Llum BCN 2018

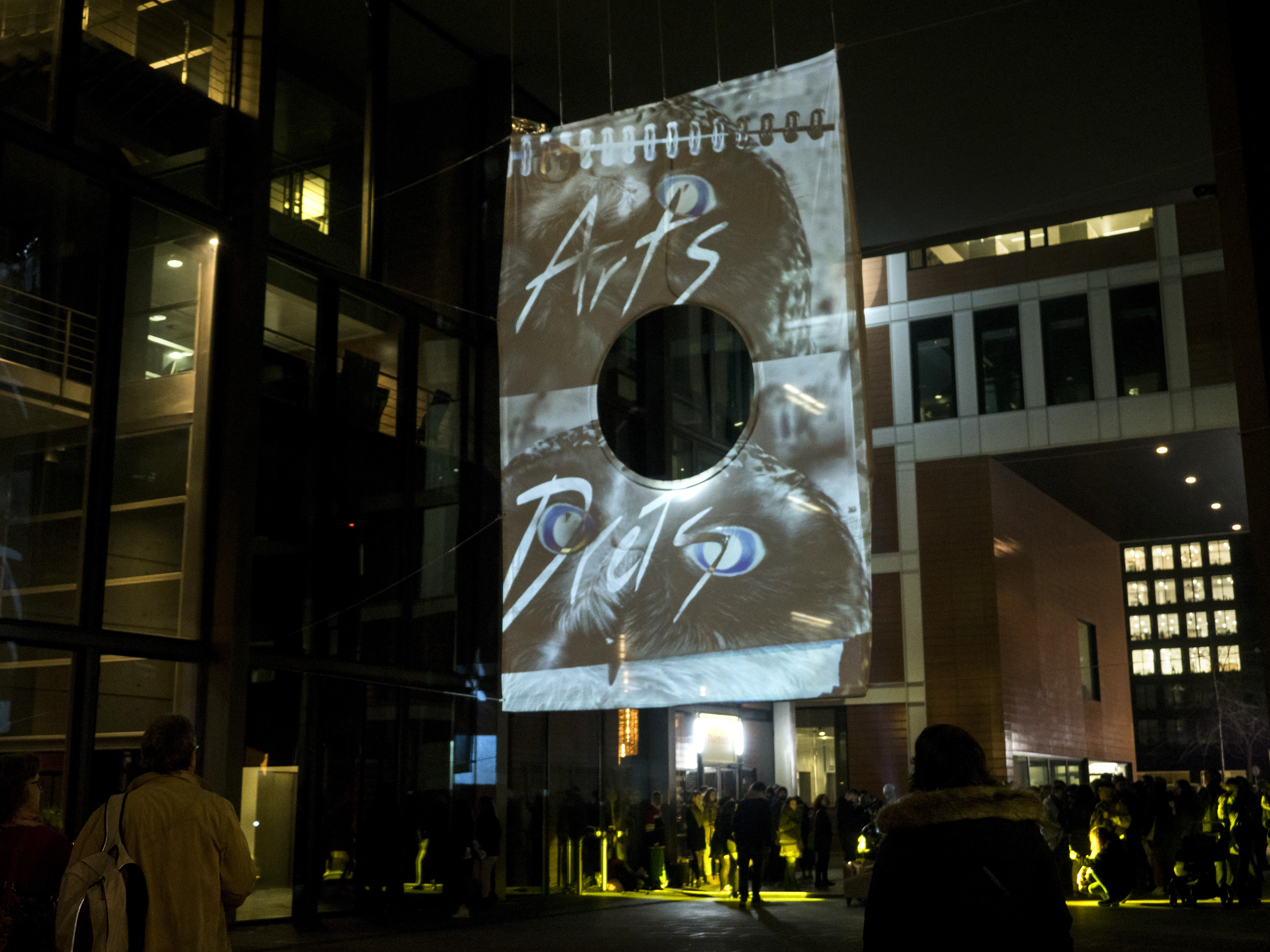
Llum BCN 2019

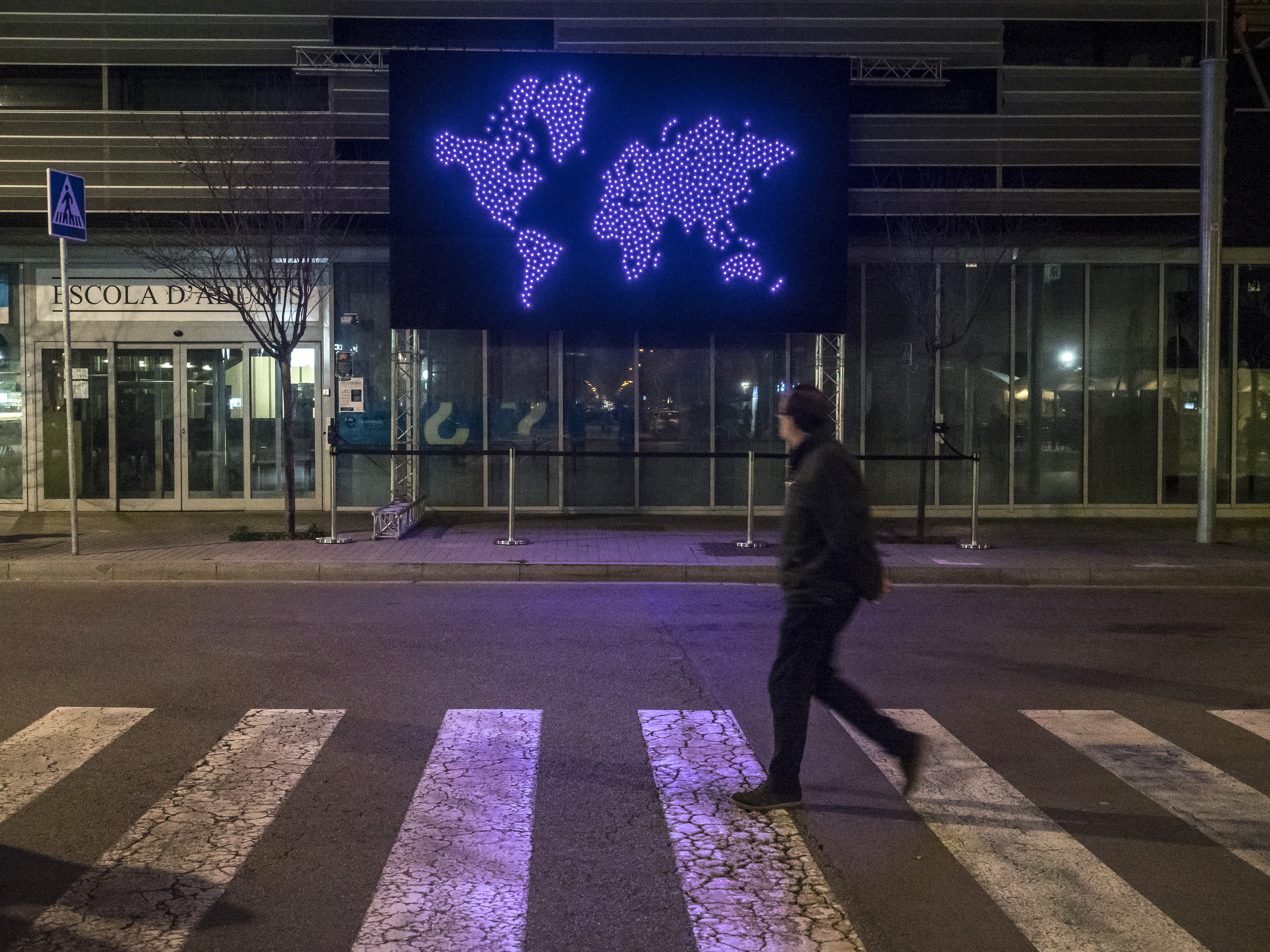
Llum BCN 2020: Worldwide injustice

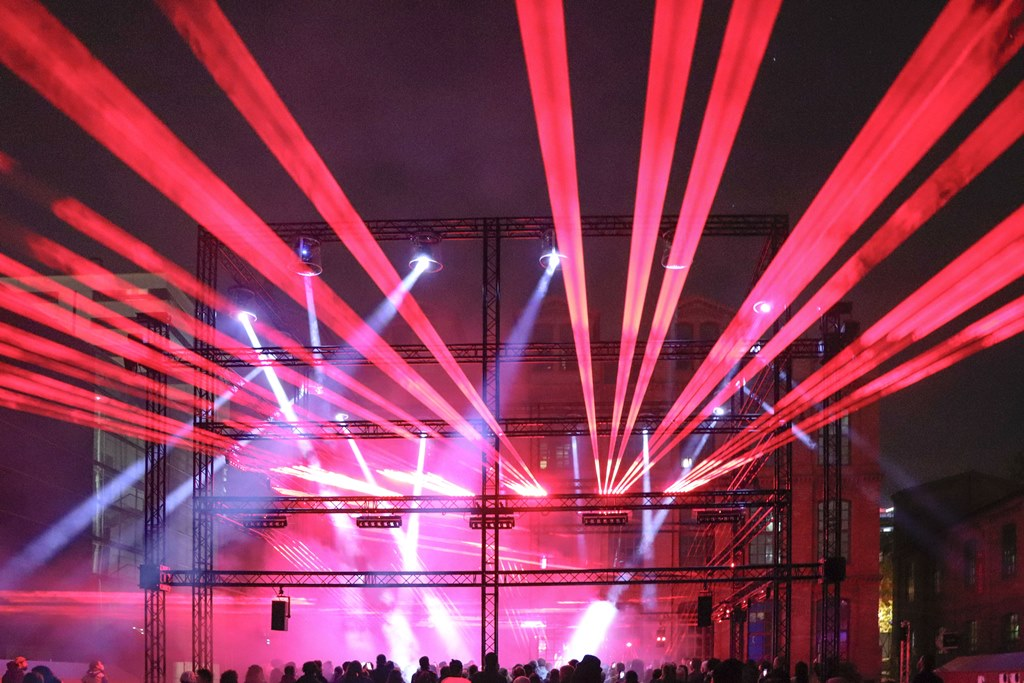
Llum BCN 2021: Onionlab, Agorythm

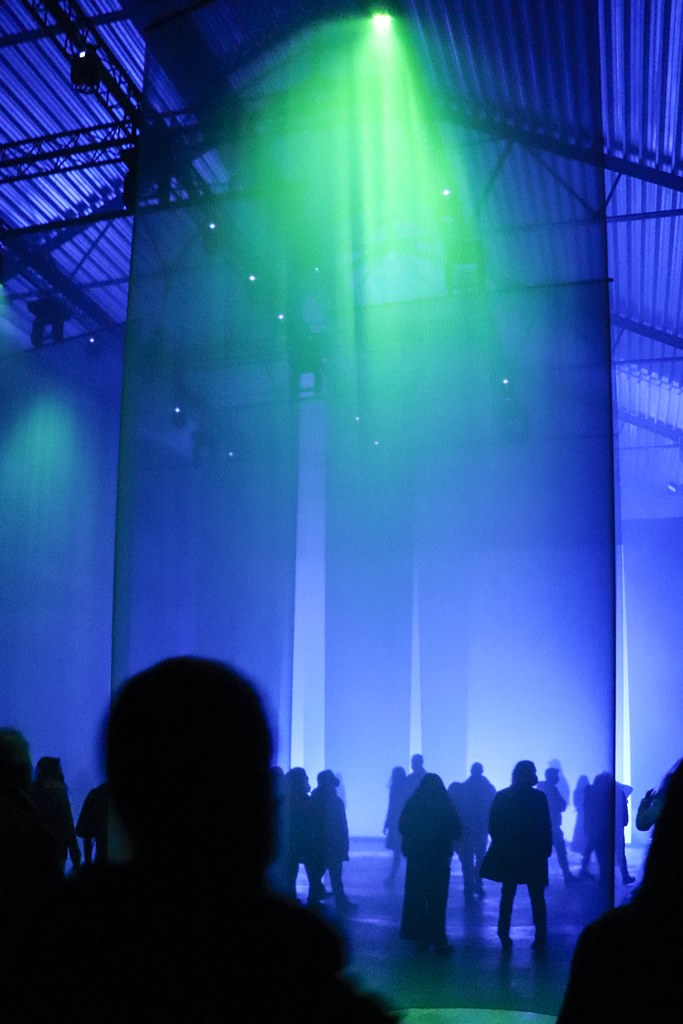
Llum BCN 2022: Toni Arola, Limbo

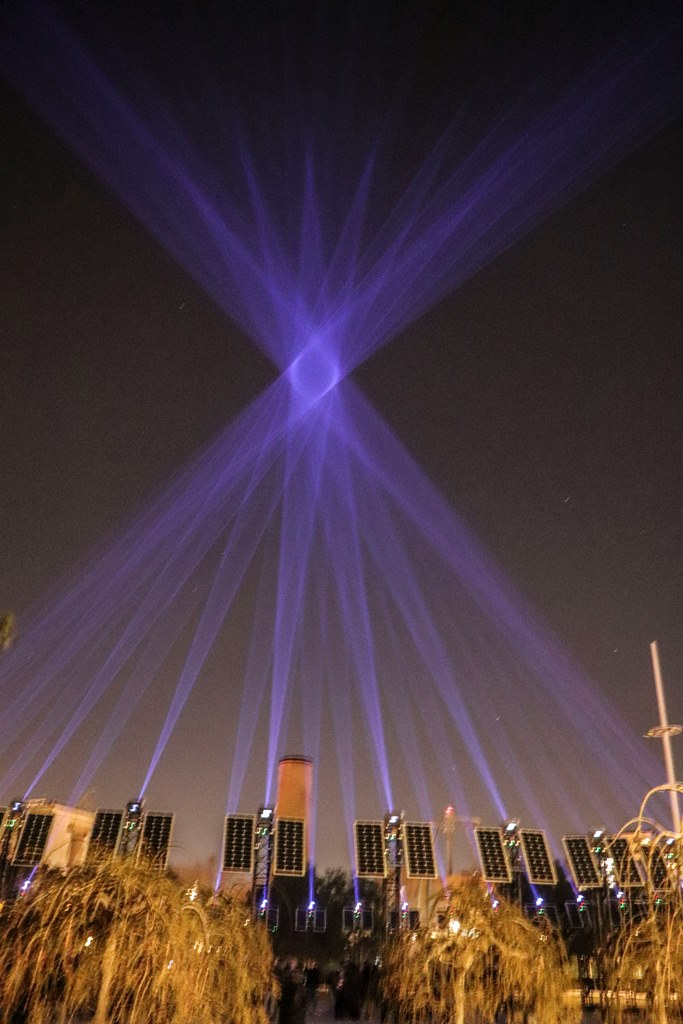
Llum BCN 2023: Another Moon

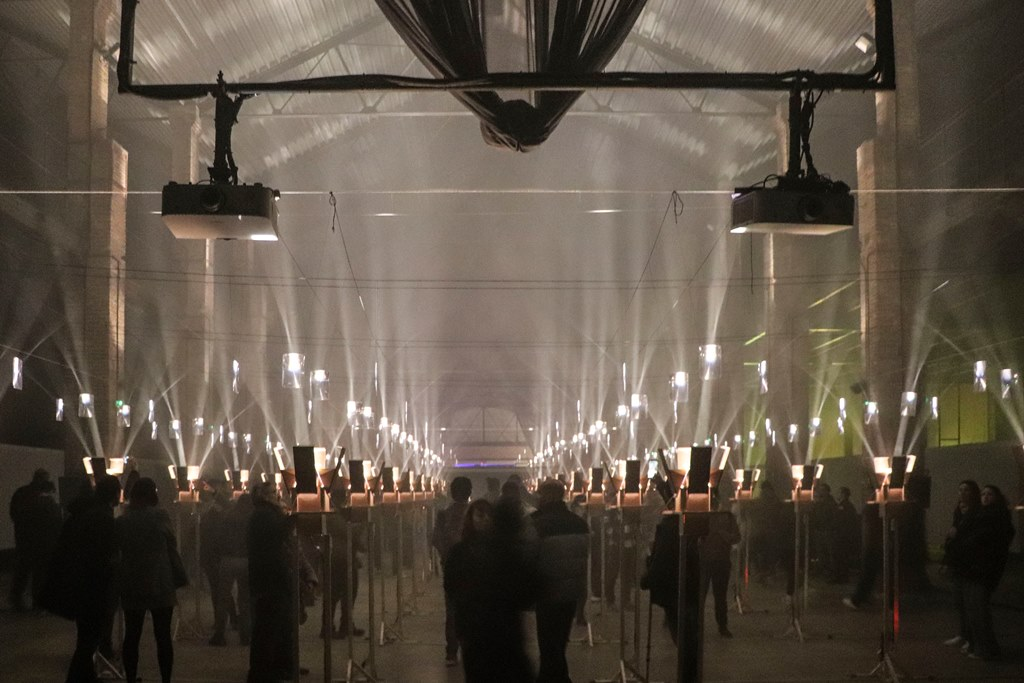
Llum BCN 2024: Lux Domus

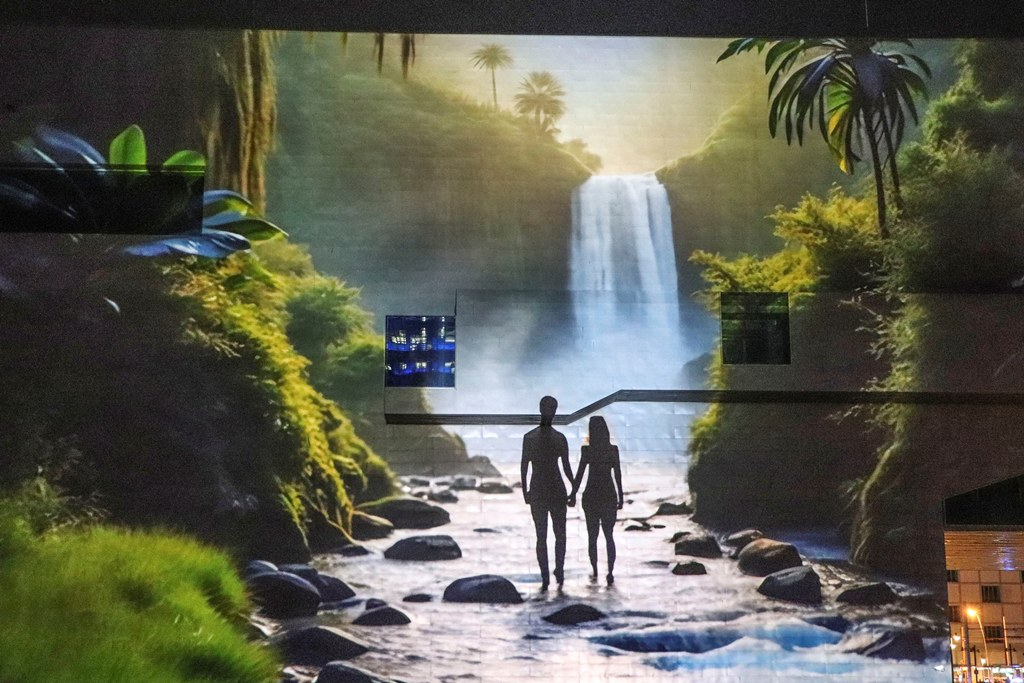
Llum BCN 2025: Joan Fontcuberta: Gènesi.IA
