= Coupon Mountain =

- Company type: Division
- Founded: 2001; 24 years ago
- Founders: Harry Tsao; Talmadge O'Neill
- Defunct: October 2014
- Headquarters: Monrovia, California, United States
- Parent: MeziMedia (2001-2010); ValueClick Brands (2010-2013); IAC (2013-2014)

Coupon Mountain was an e-commerce website based in Monrovia, California, that displayed syndicated online deals. Founded in 2001 by Harry Tsao and Talmadge O'Neill, Coupon Mountain began as one of the two original website properties for MeziMedia, which was acquired by ValueClick for up to $352 million. MeziMedia was renamed to ValueClick Brands in 2010. In November 2013, ValueClick sold several of its online properties to IAC which, in addition to Coupon Mountain, included price-comparison website PriceRunner and investment education site Investopedia for $80 million. Coupon Mountain, along with PriceRunner, was actively shopped in 2016 after slumping sales attributed to a change in Google's search algorithm but only PriceRunner was sold in March 2016 to Swedish firm NS Intressenter for around $100 million. That got fully acquired by Klarna in 2022.

At its peak in 2008, Coupon Mountain held 14% of the total market-share for coupon websites and has been offline since October 2014.

== Products and services ==
Through affiliate marketing partnerships with retailers including Target, Walmart, Kohl's, HP, and Nordstrom, Coupon Mountain supplied coupon codes and printable coupons to online shoppers.

In addition to its primary United States-based site, Coupon Mountain maintained international versions in the United Kingdom, Germany, and China.

The website's services were available free of charge, without requiring registration. On the Coupon Mountain website, users could subscribe to email notifications by store, a weekly newsletter, and RSS feeds. Coupon Mountain had 16 categories: arts & collectibles; automotive; babies & kids; books; music & video; clothing & shoes; computers; consumer electronics, flowers & gifts, food & beverages; health & beauty; home & garden; jewelry & watches; office& business; pet supplies; toys; games & sports; and travel.

== Consumer response ==
In 2008, The Wall Street Journal and The Washington Post listed Coupon Mountain as one of the most popular coupons and deals sources online. Coupon Mountain has received additional press coverage on CNN, MSNBC, and the Chicago Tribune.
