= 22@ =

Business center in Barcelona, Spain

Coordinates: 41°24′02″N 2°11′37″E

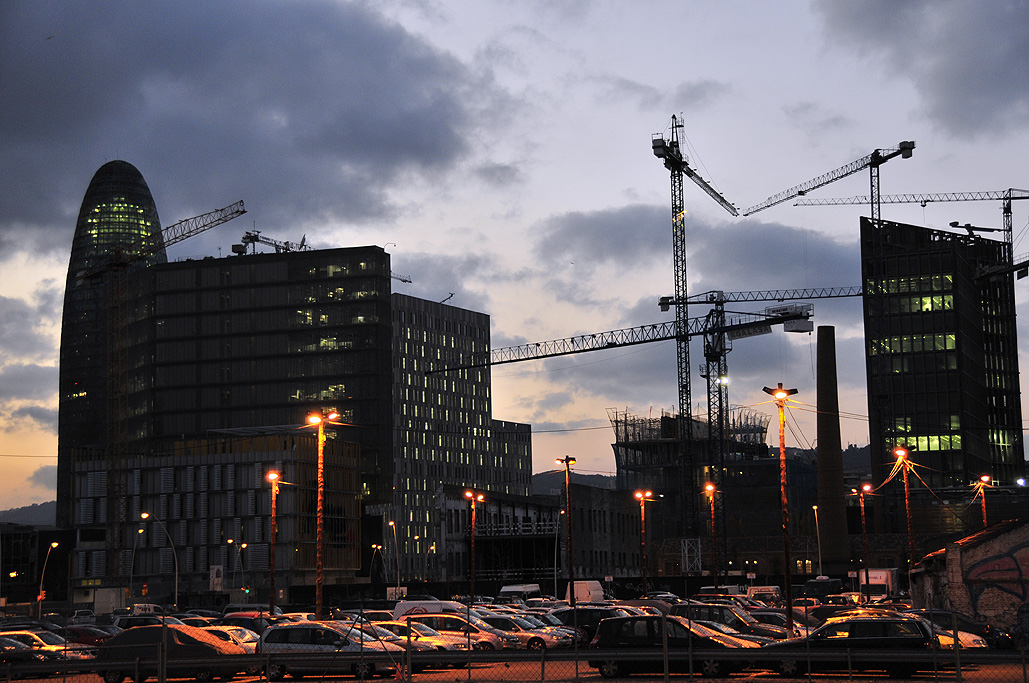
Some buildings under construction in the formerly heavily industrialised area of Poblenou, 2008.

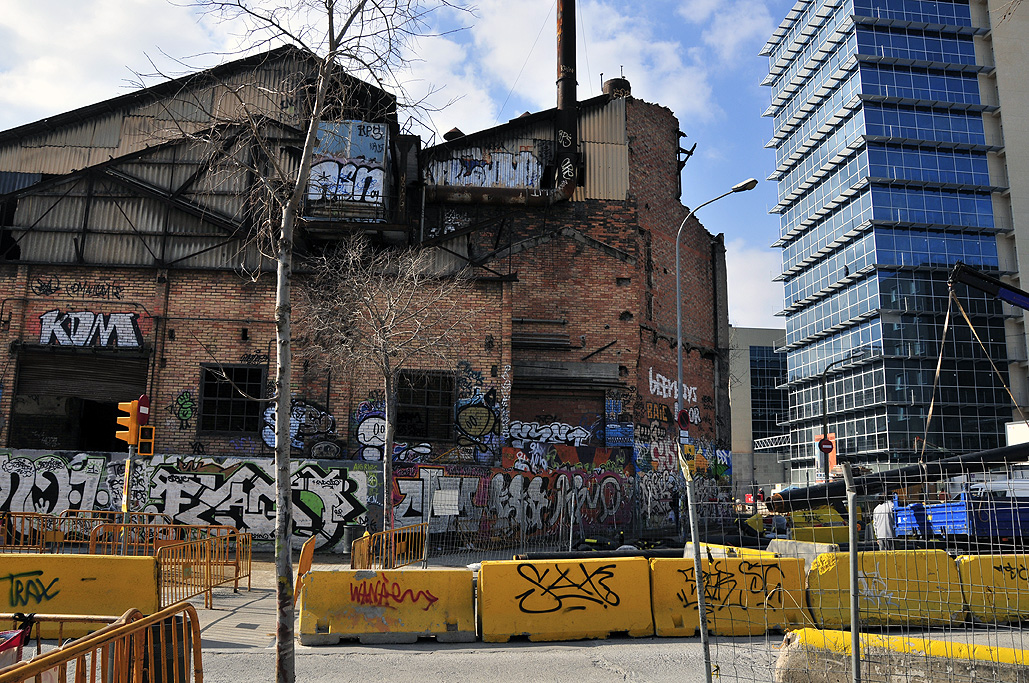
Old and new buildings still coexist in Poblenou.

22@ (read in Catalan: vint-i-dos arrova [ˌbintiˌðozəˈrɔβə]), also known as 22@Barcelona and Districte de la innovació (Innovation District) is the corporative name given to an urban renewal area in Barcelona's formerly industrial area of Poblenou, in the district of Sant Martí, nicknamed "the Catalan Manchester" in the 19th century. Its aim is to convert Poblenou into the city's technological and innovation district, as well as to increase leisure and residential spaces. Centered on Plaça de les Glòries Catalanes, it is part of one of Europe's biggest urban regeneration schemes, begun during the 2000s and still ongoing, spanning 115 blocks (198.26 hectares (489.9 acres)). The plan was approved in 2000 by the city council when the new 22@ land designation was introduced, replacing the 22a designation, used in city zoning.

The 22@Barcelona model is already being applied in other areas of the city and is a benchmark in urban, economic and social transformation in cities like Rio de Janeiro, Boston, Istanbul and Cape Town. It is a compact and diverse city that, instead of applying a territorial specialization model, employs a mixed model that favors social cohesion and fosters balanced and sustainable urban and economic development.

Ultimately, the project will create 4 million square meters of constructed floor space, 3.2 million of which will be used for productive activities and 800,000 for housing and services. So far, regeneration has begun on approximately 68% of the industrial areas in Poblenou. Noteworthy among these plans is the Industrial Heritage Protection Plan, which consolidates protective measures for 114 elements, and outside the 22@Barcelona area, the Poblenou Historical Center Protection Plan and the Diagonal-Besòs Campus.

Regarding infrastructure, 14,800 lm of streets have been urbanized–of a total of 37 km—which equals 19,649 m^{2} of streets—with a high level of services, 46 new conducts, sewers, selective pneumatic waste collection, district heating and cooling system, 47,000 m of dark fiber optics, etc.

As of 2013, 22@Barcelona has 83,640 business premises, according to the city register, 42.5% more than in 2002, when there were 58,690.

As of December 2011, an estimated 4,500 new companies had moved to the district since 2000, an average of 545 per year and 1.2 per day, although the most prolific era was from 2003 to 2006. Of the 4,500 companies, 47.3% were new start-ups. The rest moved from other locations. About 31% of companies in 22@ are technology- or knowledge-based companies.

Since 2001 more than 4,500 new companies have opened offices in the Distrito 22@, including Yahoo! I+D, Mediapro, Microsoft, Sanofi-Aventis, Groupalia, Capgemini, Schneider Electric, SAP, NTT Data or Indra, and they have created more than 56,000 new jobs.

The estimated number of workers in the district is 90,000 (not counting freelance workers), 62.5% more than in 2000 for a total increase of 56,200 workers. Additionally, the global business turnover, not only of companies that carry out @ activities, totals some 8,900 million euros per year.

Since 2001, the resident population in 22@Barcelona has grown 22.8%, from 73,464 inhabitants to 90,214 (16,750 more people). This increase is 15% higher than the average for the city of Barcelona, which experienced a growth of 8% between 2001 and 2009.

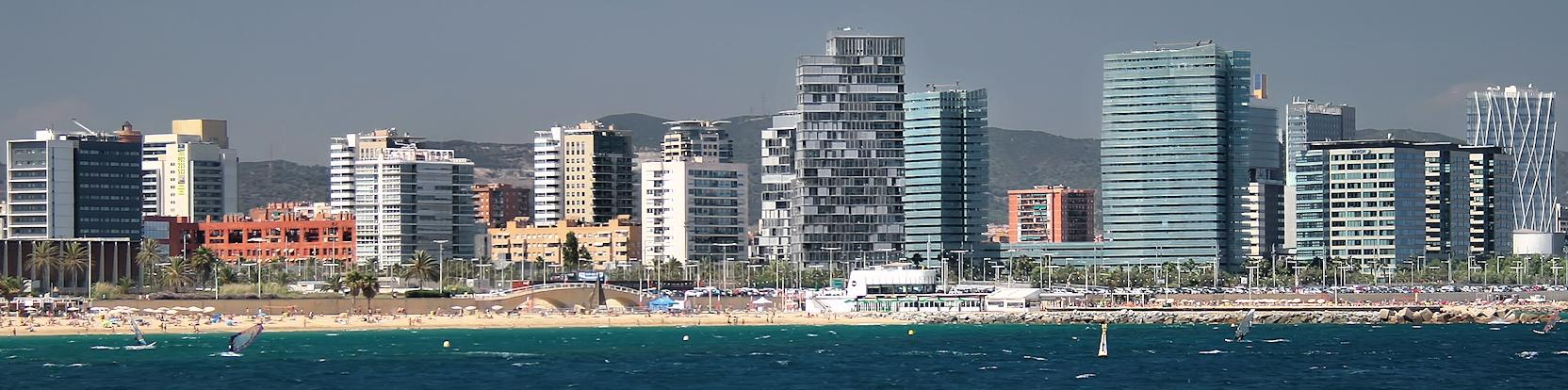
A part of the 22@Barcelona, view from sea
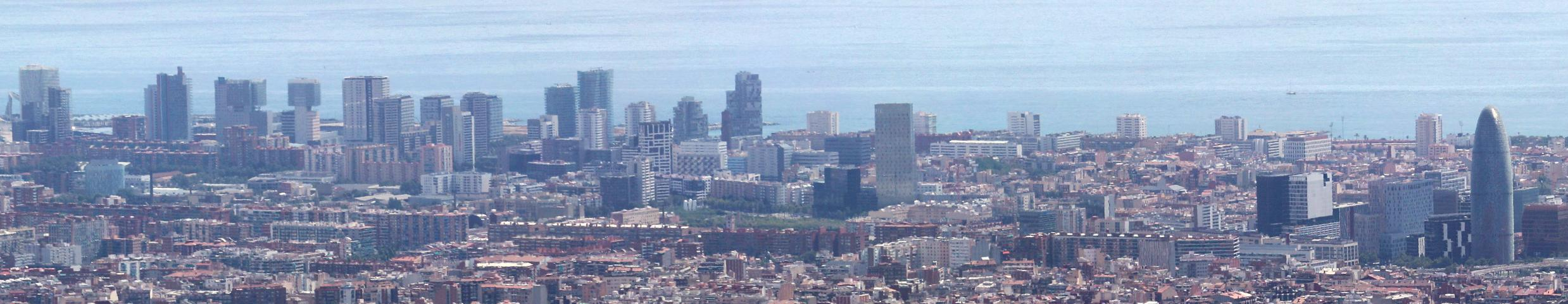
Skyscrapers in Diagonal Mar, Barcelona

== See also ==
- Effects of the 1992 Summer Olympics
- Urban planning of Barcelona
