= Selva de Mar station =

Metro station in Barcelona, Spain

Coordinates: 41°24′30″N 2°12′35″E

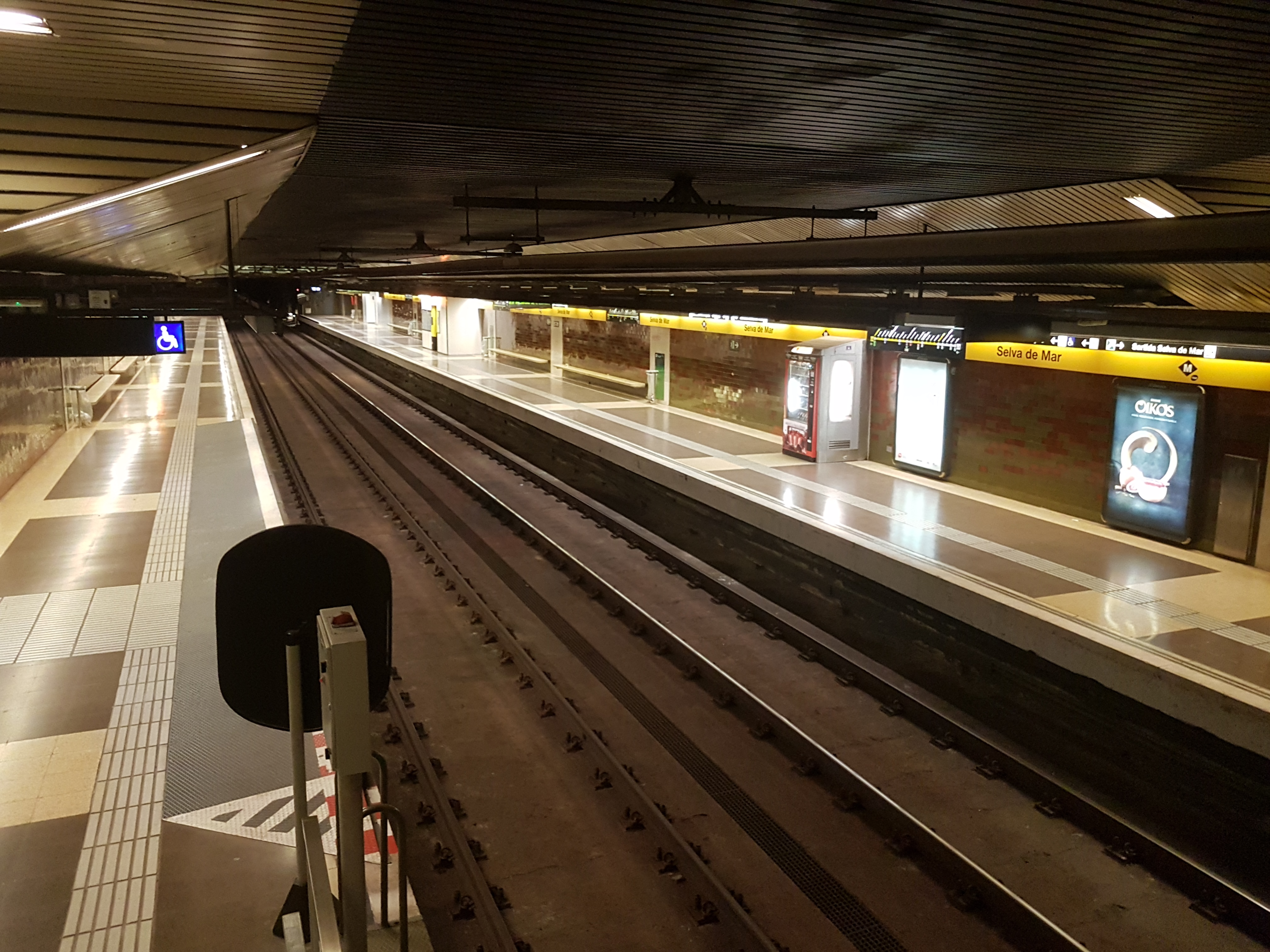
Selva de Mar station platforms

Selva de Mar (Catalan pronunciation: [ˈsɛlβə ðə ˈmar]) is a Barcelona Metro and Trambesòs station located in Poblenou, Sant Martí district, Barcelona. It's located under carrer de Pujades, between carrer de Provençals (where the step-free entrance is located) and carrer de Selva de Mar - where the alternative entrance is. The metro station, served by L4, was opened in 1977 (49 years ago) as part of the elongation of the line from Barceloneta. The tramway station is a 2004 addition, opened that year along with other stations in the T4 route.

== Services ==
Preceding station	Metro	Following station
Poblenou towards Trinitat Nova	L4	El Maresme | Fòrum towards La Pau

== See also ==
- List of Barcelona Metro stations
- List of tram stations in Barcelona
