= Groupalia =

Online buying group

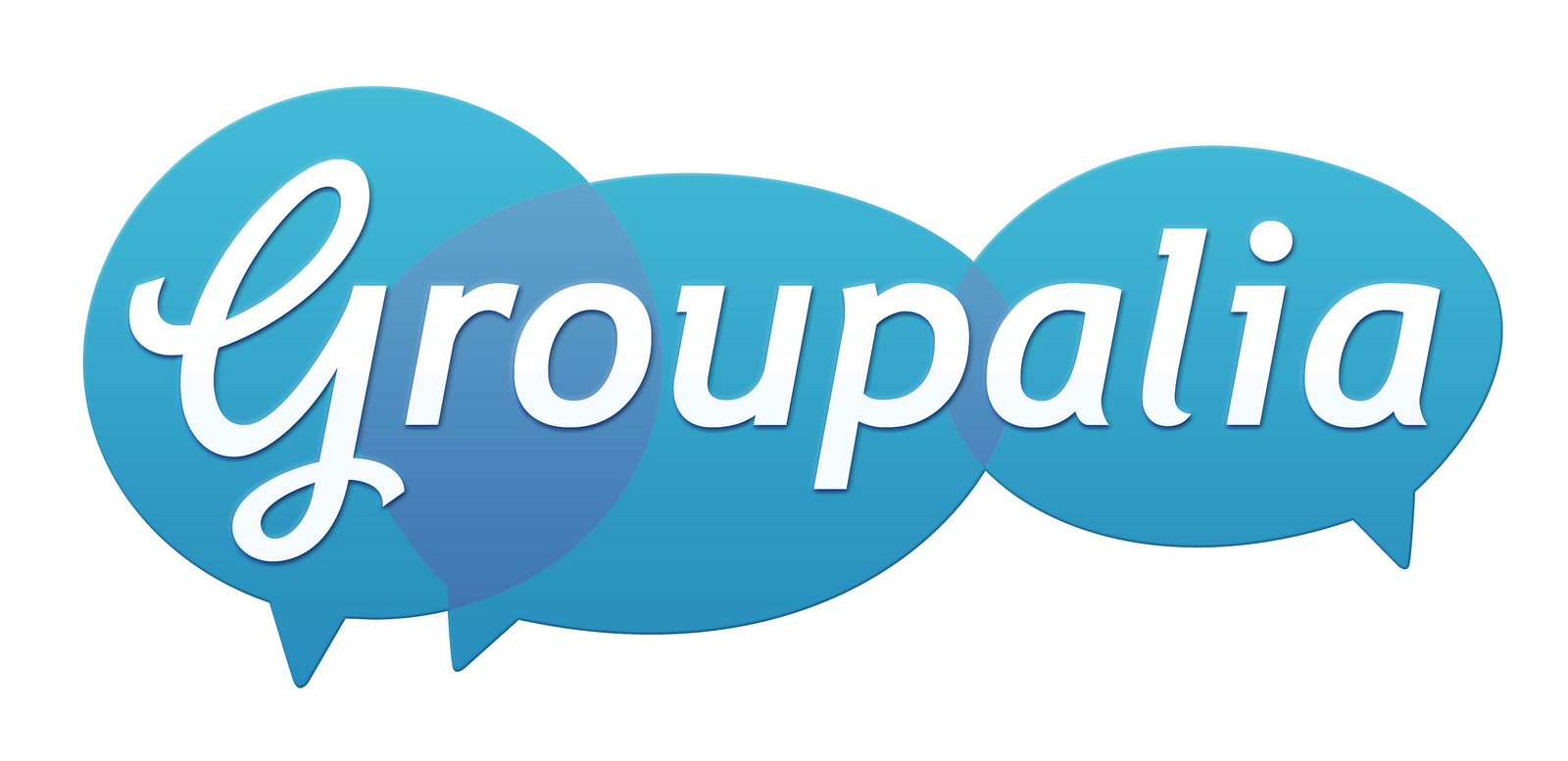
- Website type: Electronic commerce
- Headquarters: Barcelona, Spain
- Employees: 250 (August 2014)
- Website: es.groupalia.com
- Commercial: Yes
- Launched: May 2010
- Current status: Active

Groupalia is the trade name for Groupalia Compra Colectiva SL, an online group buying company based in Spain. Groupalia sells leisure packages: travel, services and products. The company was established in Barcelona in May 2010. Its first virtual shop was in Barcelona, followed by Madrid.

The company had its first round of funding in April 2010, $15 million, and a second one in August, a $26 million round. Groupalia is based in Barcelona (Spain), it employs over 300 people and has more than 6 million users worldwide. The current director of the company is Albert Bosch.

== See also ==
- Coupon
- Voucher
