= List of hotels in Spain =

This is a list of notable hotels, current or former, in Spain ordered by autonomous region. The list mainly includes five and four star hotels.

== Andalusia ==
- Castillo de Santa Catalina (Jaén)
- Convento de la Magdalena
- Hotel Alfonso XIII
- Hotel Anglo-Hispano
- Hotel París (Huelva)
- Hotel Sevilla (Algeciras)
- Palacio del Deán Ortega

=== Málaga ===
- Hotel Pez Espada (Torremolinos)

=== Marbella ===
- Gran Hotel Gvadalpin Banús
- Hotel Puente Romano
- Marbella Club
- Hotel Reina Cristina (Ronda)
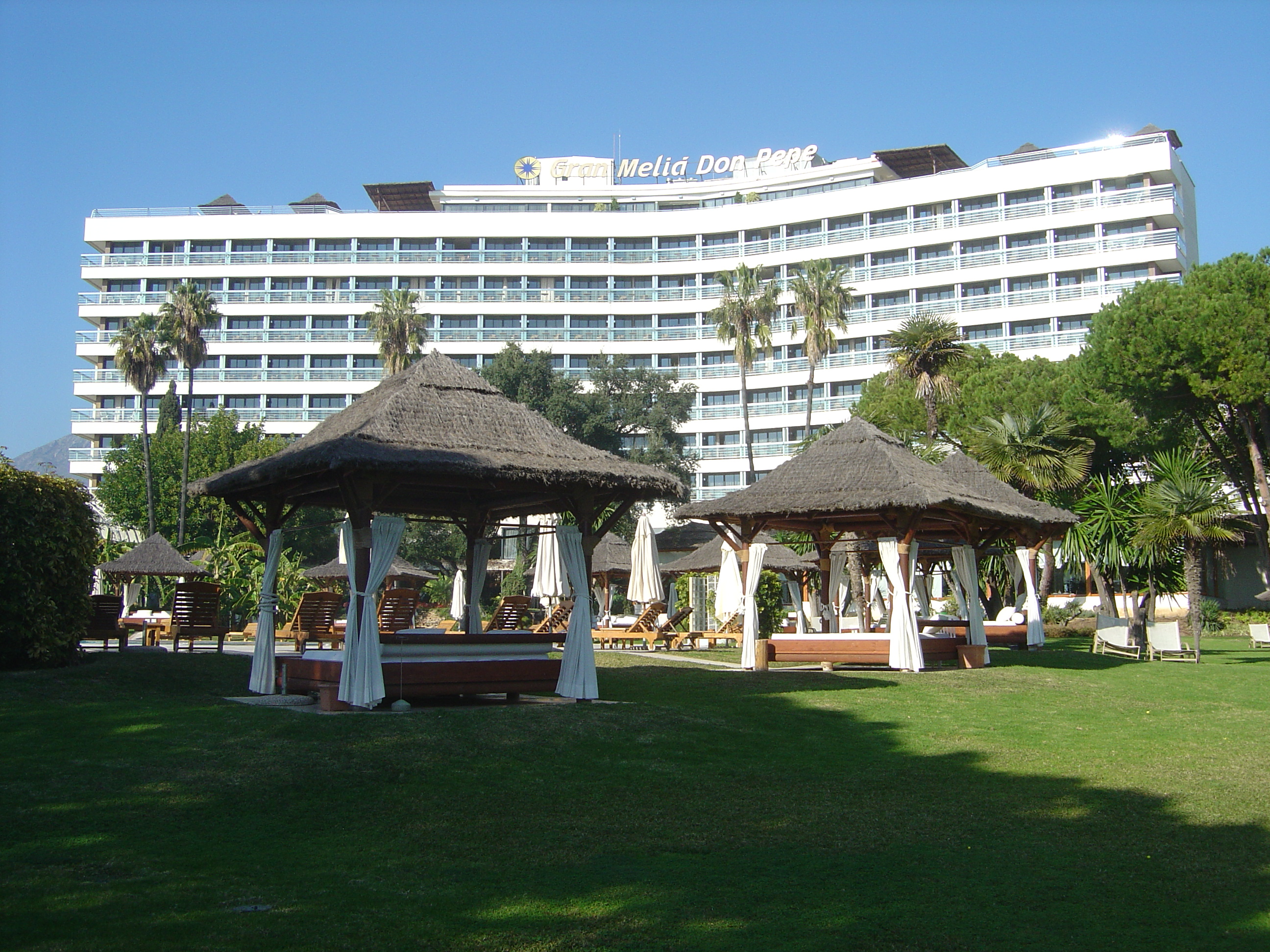
Meliá Don Pepe

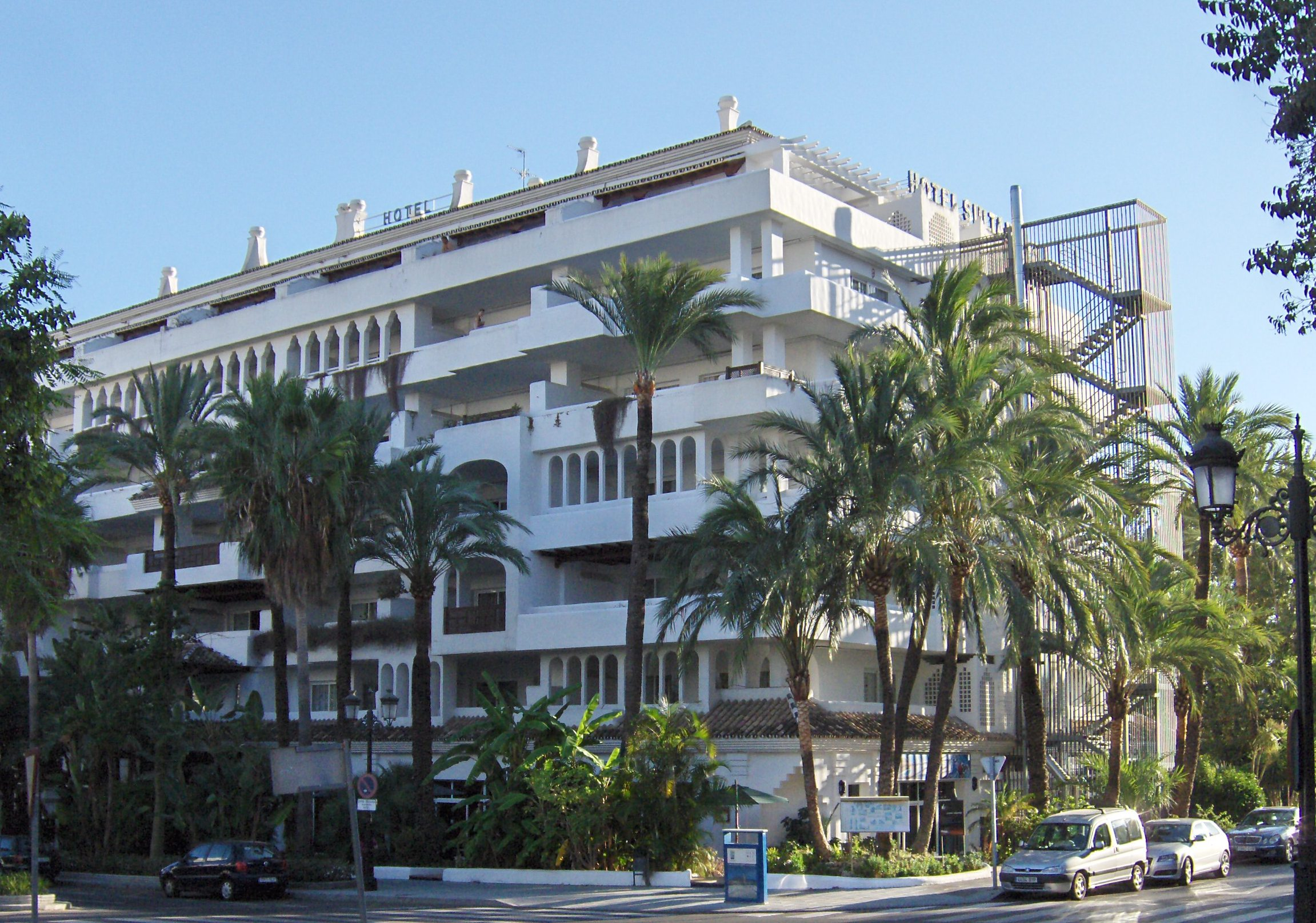
Hotel Sultán Club

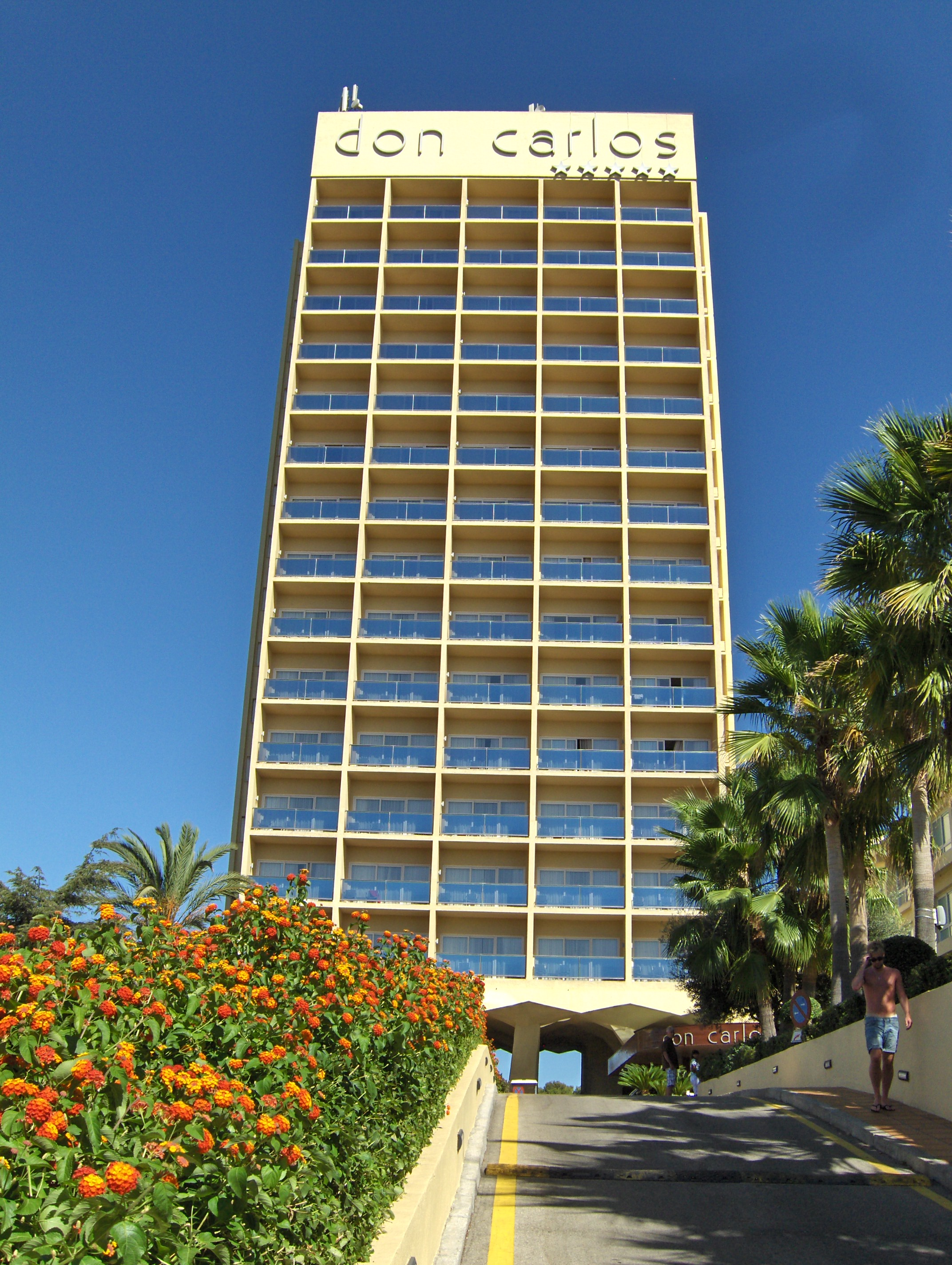
Hotel Don Carlos

== Balearic Islands ==
- Hotel Montesol, Ibiza Town
- Ibiza Gran Hotel, Ibiza Town

== Basque Country ==
- Hotel La Perla

== Catalonia ==
- Hesperia Tower

=== Barcelona ===
- Hotel Arts
- Hotel Majestic
- W Barcelona

== Community of Madrid ==
- Grand Hôtel de París
- Hotel Florida
- Hotel Palace
- Hotel Puerta América
- Hotel Ritz
- Torre Sacyr Vallehermoso

== Valencian Community ==
- Gran Hotel Bali, Benidorm
- Hotel Rio Park, Benidorm
