= Gran Hotel =

Gran Hotel may refer to:

== Hotels ==
- Gran Hotel Bali, a 4-star hotel located in Benidorm, Spain
- NH Gran Hotel Provincial, a five star establishment in Mar del Plata, Argentina
- Gran Hotel (Arrecife), a skyscraper in Arrecife, Canary Islands, Spain
- Gran Hotel (Costa Rica), San José, Costa Rica
- Gran Hotel (Palma), Palma de Mallorca, Spain
- Gran Hotel Almería
- Gran Hotel Bolivar
- Gran Hotel Guadalpin Banús
- Gran Hotel Manzana Kempinski La Habana
- Gran Hotel Montesol Ibiza
- Gran Hotel Torre Catalunya

== Media ==
- Gran Hotel (TV series), a 2011 Spanish drama television series
- Gran Hotel (film), a 1944 Mexican film
- "Gran Hotel", a song by Interpol from their 2022 album The Other Side of Make-Believe
