= Hotel Paris =

Hotel Paris may refer to:

- Hotel Paris (Idaho), a hotel in Paris, Idaho, United States
- Hotel París (Huelva), a hotel in Huelva, Spain
- Hotel Paris (Prague), a hotel in Prague, Czech Republic
