= Pedro Espinosa =

Spanish Baroque poet and anthologist

Pedro Espinosa (Antequera, June 4, 1578 – Sanlúcar de Barrameda, October 21, 1650), was a Spanish Baroque poet and anthologist.

== Biography ==
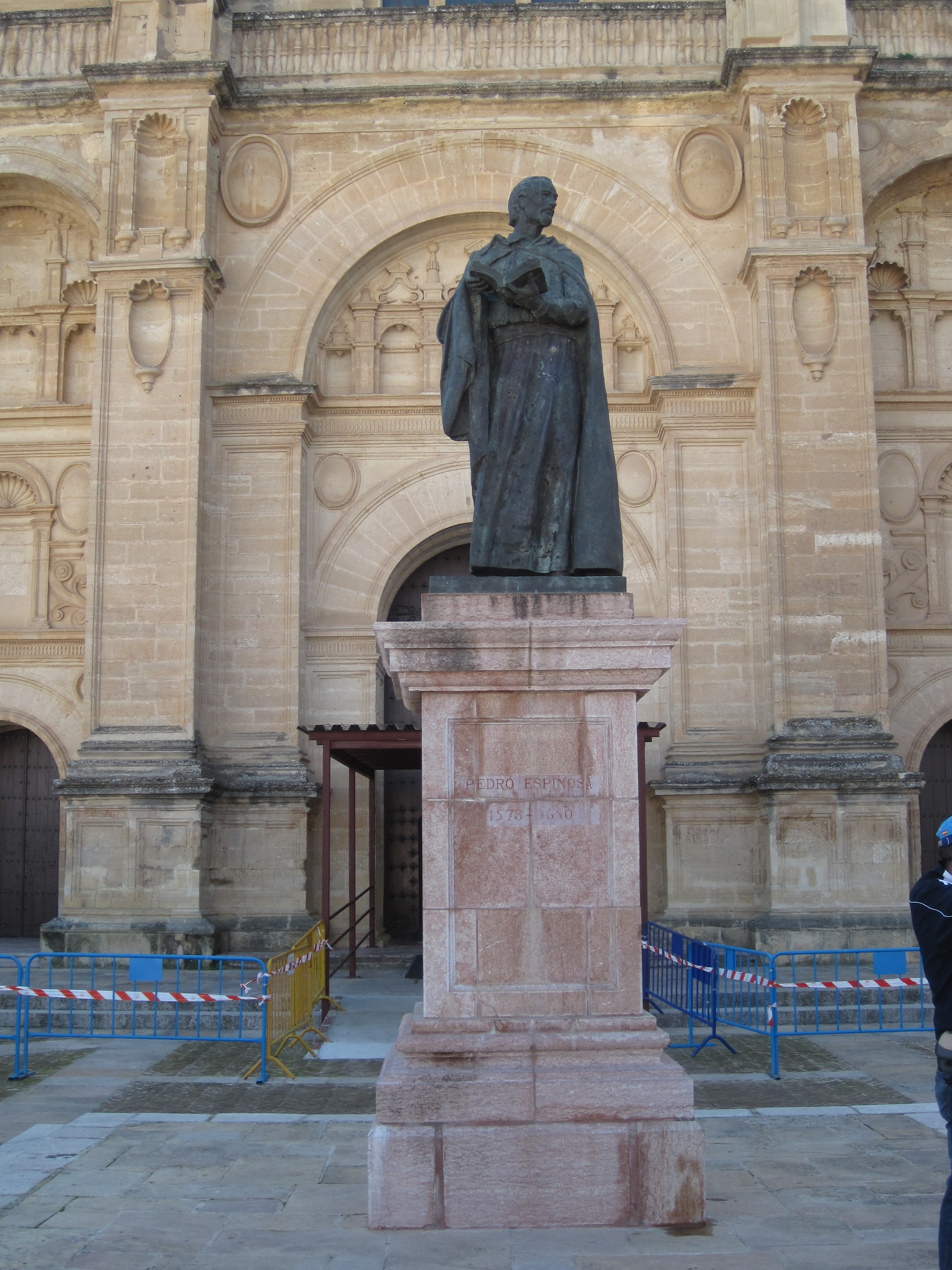
Sculpture of Pedro Espinosa in Antequera, Spain

Espinosa studied Canons and Theology. He attended the Granada Poetic Academy, led by Pedro de Granada Venegas. There he met Gonzalo Mateo de Berrío. During a stay in Seville, he became acquainted with Juan de Arguijo. During this period he compiled the materials for a poetic anthology titled ‘Flowers of Illustrious Poets’.

In the 1603 traveled to Valladolid, and later to Madrid, where he made friends with poets such as Góngora and Quevedo, Lope de Vega, Tirso de Molina and Luis Vélez de Guevara. Espinosa retired to the hermitage of Magdalena (near Antequera), and in 1615 he moved to Sanlúcar de Barrameda where he became a priest and a hermit.

== Bibliography ==
- "Obras"; Francisco Rodríguez Marín, Madrid: RAE, 1909.
- "Poesías completas"; Francisco López Estrada, Madrid: Espasa-Calpe, 1975.
- "Obra en prosa"; Francisco López Estrada. Málaga: Área de Cultura de la Diputación Provincial, 1991.

== Sources ==
- Francisco Rodríguez Marín, Pedro Espinosa. Estudio biográfico, bibliográfico y crítico. Madrid, 1907, reprint by University of Málaga, 2004.
- Pablo Villar Amador, Estudio de Las flores de poetas ilustres de España, de Pedro Espinosa. University of Granada, 1994.
