= Hotel Alfonso XIII =

Hotel in Seville, Spain

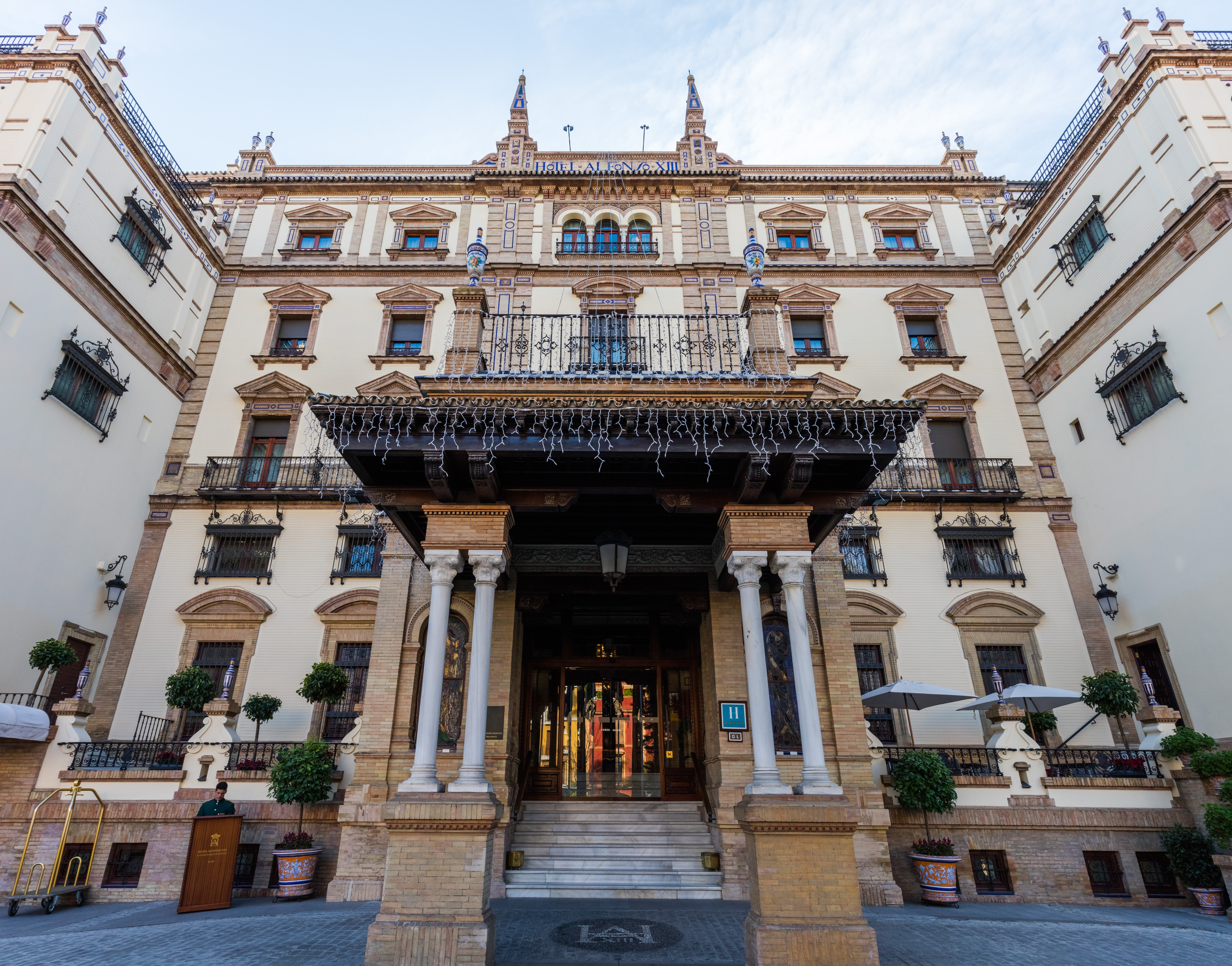
- Facade

General information
- Location: Seville, Spain, Calle San Fernando, 2
- Coordinates: 37°22′56″N 5°59′32″W
- Opening: 1929
- Operator: Marriott International

Design and construction
- Architect: José Espiau y Muñoz

Other information
- Number of rooms: 151

Website
- Official website

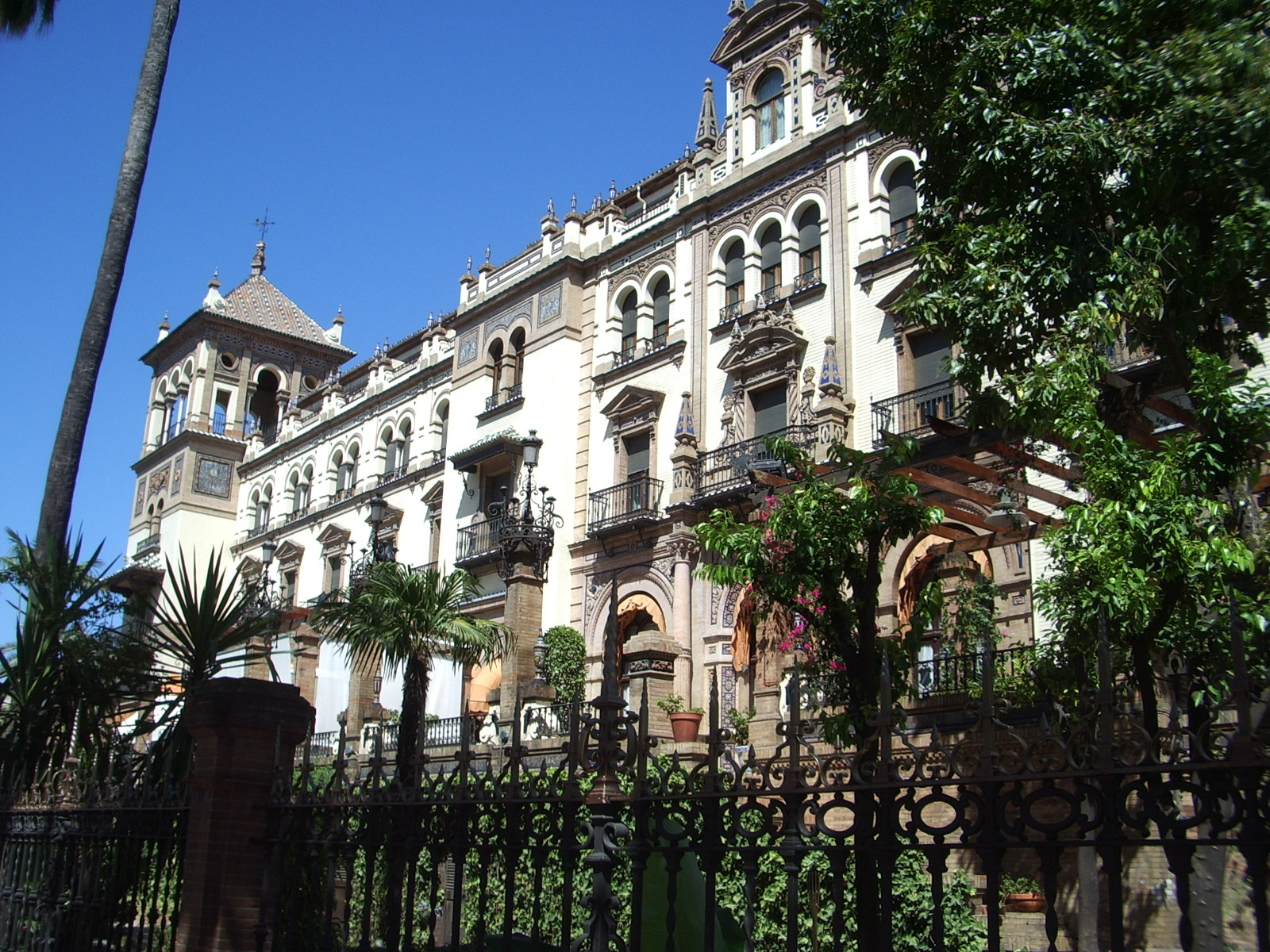
View of the building.

Hotel Alfonso XIII is a historic hotel in Seville, Spain, located on Calle San Fernando, next to the University of Seville. Designed by the architect José Espiau y Muñoz, it was built between 1916 and 1928 especially for the Ibero-American Exposition of 1929. It officially opened on April 28, 1929, with a sumptuous banquet attended by King Alfonso XIII and Queen Victoria Eugenie of Battenberg. The hotel is owned by the City of Seville and managed by The Luxury Collection division of Marriott International.

== History ==
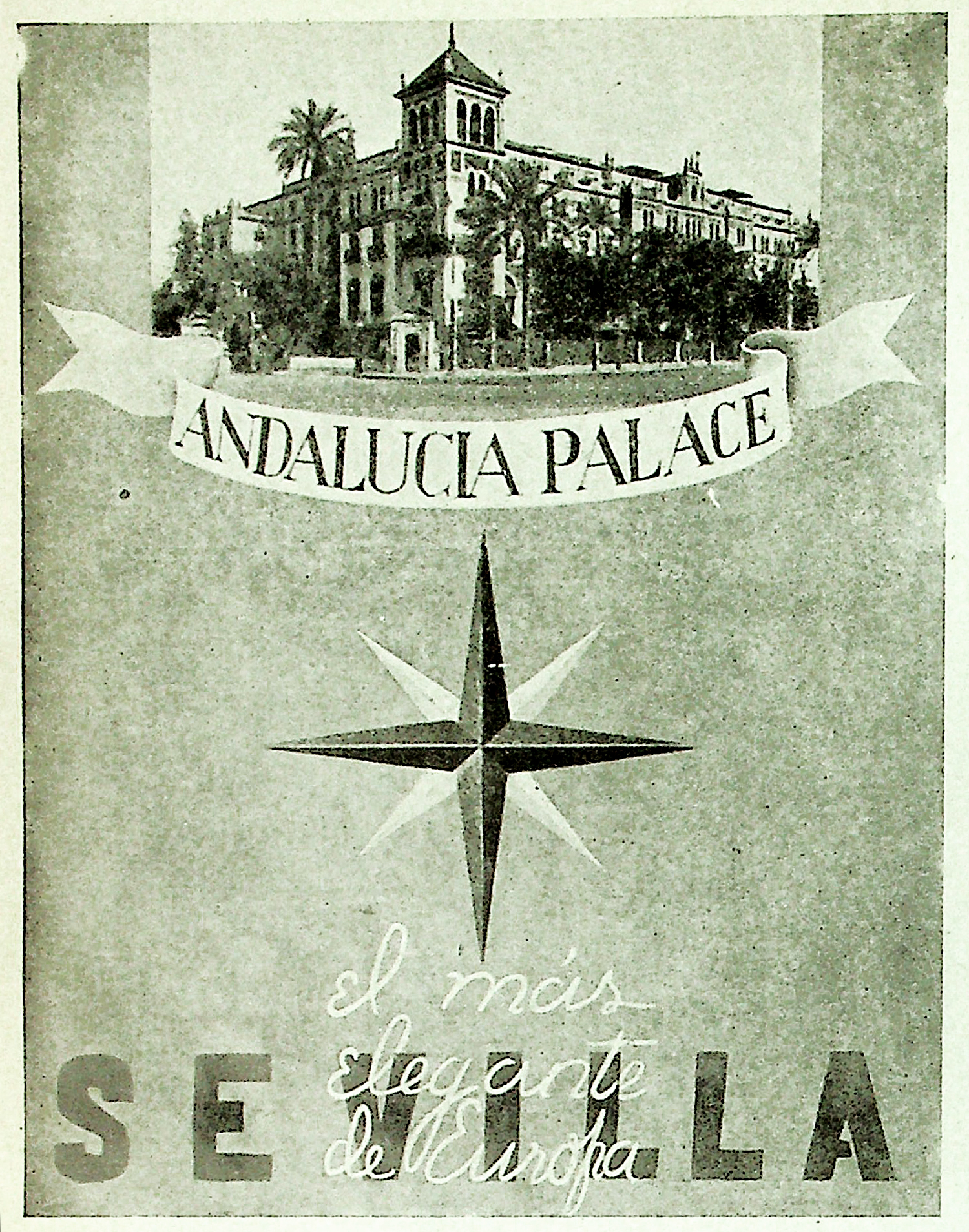
1930s ad for the hotel

Designed by architect José Espiau y Muñoz, the hotel was built between 1916 and 1928, and officially inaugurated on 28 April 1929, with a celebration preceded by King Alfonso XIII and Queen Victoria Eugenia. The reason of the celebration was the wedding of Infanta Isabel with count Juan Zamoyski.

The hotel was a winning project chosen among others after a contest was held under the direction of renowned architect Aníbal González. Espiau reached the award, and built a hotel destined to be the hotel of the Iberoamerican Exposition of 1929.

King Alfonso XIII was deposed in 1931, and the hotel was renamed the Hotel Andalucia Palace throughout the Second Republic.

== Architecture ==
The building is in the Neo-Mudéjar style. This style is historicist and, in this case also has an aspect of Andalusian regionalism. Initially designed in 1916, it blends in with the overall aesthetics of the buildings planned for the Ibero-American Exposition of 1929. Its façade and its overall construction display a significant wealth of decorative elements and details, built from materials that could well be considered as frugal or simple: mostly brick, plaster, wood and ceramics.

The interior puts forth a display of wealth and status: arches and columns, decorated with elaborate coffered hanging lamps and fine carpets from the Royal Tapestry Factory. Ornamented ceramic tiles (azulejos) decorate walls, ceilings and all manner of structures. The luxurious rooms were designed to accommodate kings, presidents, celebrities and other guests of the Ibero-American Exposition of 1929. The floors are marble and wood.

=== Banqueting halls ===
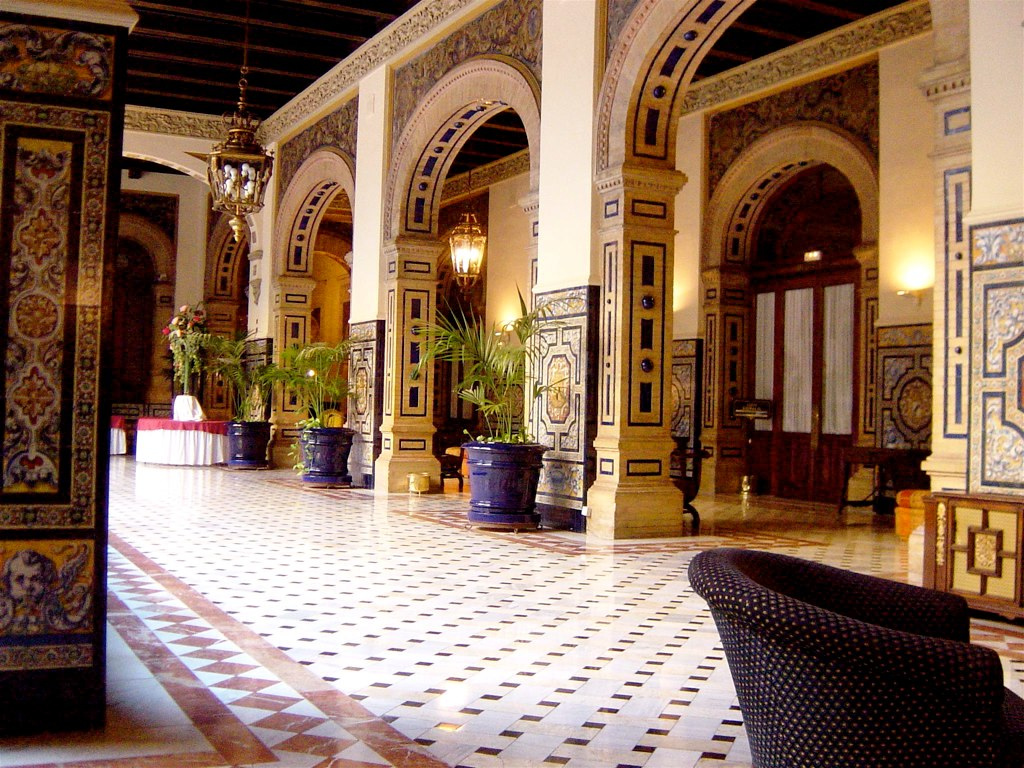
Interiors of the hotel

The hotel has six banqueting halls, the largest of which accommodates up to 650 people. The Royal Hall, the largest and most ornate, was originally the hotel's main dining room. It is accessed through a wrought iron gate similar to those that enclose the choirs of several Andalusian cathedrals. Inside, eleven bronze chandeliers hung with Bohemian crystal and plated in gold descend from a palatial coffered ceiling. Large arched doorways inlaid with mahogany and inlaid tiles (azulejos) lead to a terrace over the garden of the hotel. Other neoclassical banqueting halls or salons—Andalusia, Híspalis and Cartuja—feature arched doors and windows with frames of golden stucco, more Bohemian glass chandeliers and marble floors.

=== Inner courtyard ===
As is typical of the region, the hotel has an inner courtyard or patio. The original design inspired was for a courtyard modeled on that of Seville's baroque Hospital de los Venerables, but was redesigned at the express request of Alfonso XIII, who disapproved of the original plan.

=== Rooms ===
The building has a total of 147 guest rooms, each unique:

- 19 single rooms.
- 55 luxury double rooms.
- 55 larger "deluxe" rooms, with lamps of Venetian glass from Murano, and wooden ceilings. There are three categories of decoration: Castilian, Baroque and Mozarabic.
- 1 Royal Suite, used by royal families who are visiting Seville.

=== Other ===
The building also includes several bars, the San Fernando restaurant, a pool, a gym, a massage center, and several terraces and gardens.

== Illustrious guests ==
Diplomats representing the Ibero-American countries, as well as King Alfonso and his wife, attended the 1929 exhibition. However, no foreign presidents attended, except the Norwegian Prime Minister Johan Ludwig Mowinckel, who came for a private visit, and the Portuguese President António Óscar de Fragoso Carmona. The hotel housed personalities during the 1992 show, such as the Prince Charles and Diana of Wales. It is common for celebrities visiting the city to stay there, such as Brad Pitt, Angelina Jolie, Tom Cruise, Cameron Díaz, Madonna and Bruce Springsteen.

== See also ==
- List of hotels in Spain
