= Hotel Pez Espada =

Hotel in Torremolinos, Spain

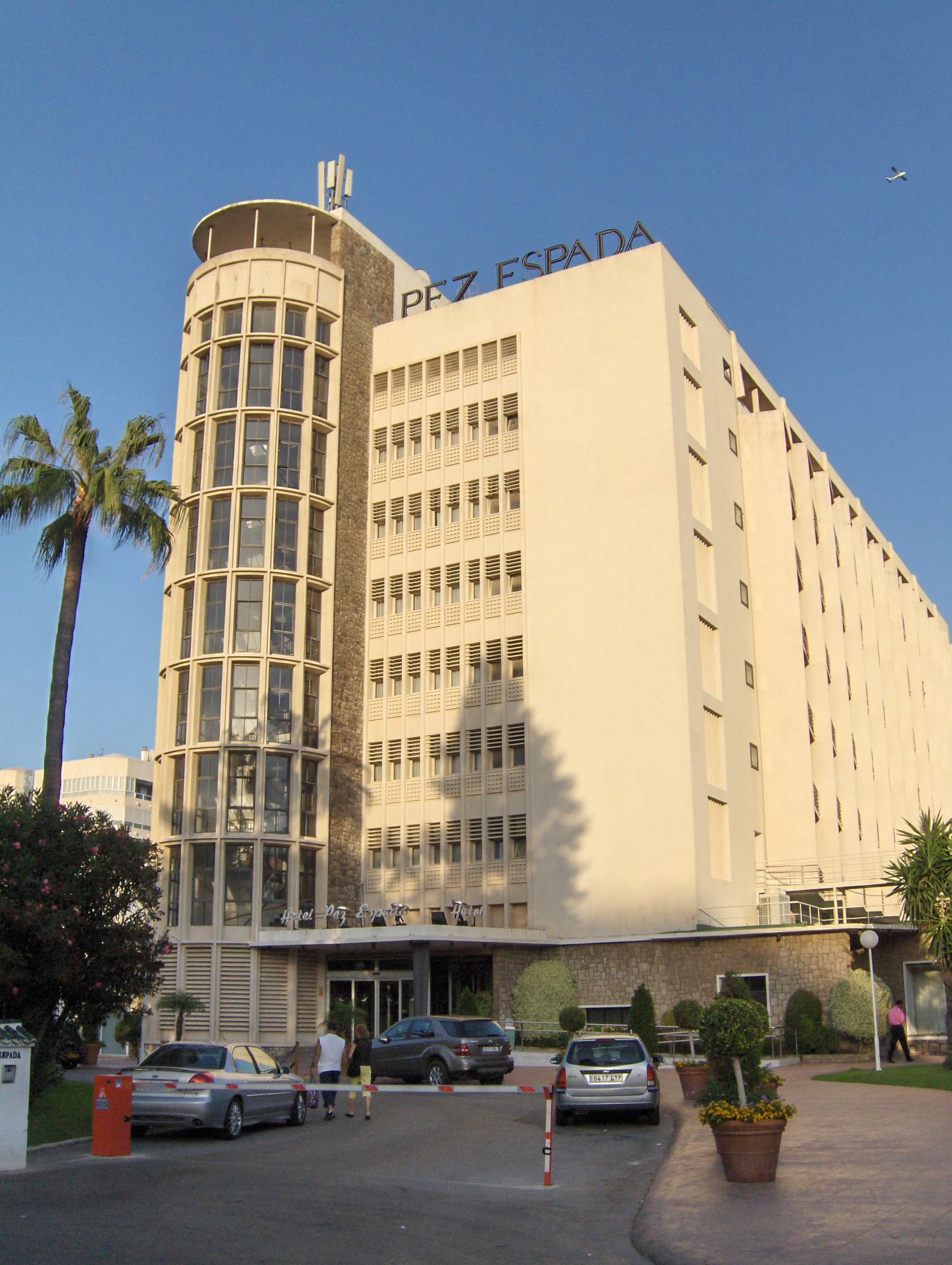

- Location within Andalusia

General information
- Location: Torremolinos, Andalusia, Spain
- Coordinates: 36°36′22″N 4°30′28″W
- Completed: 1959

Inaugurated on May 31, 1959 as a five-star establishment, since its inception it has had illustrious clients or visitors such as Umberto II of Italy, King Feisal, Baudouin of Belgium, the Empress Soraya of Persia, the Princes Prince Rainier III and Grace of Monaco, the Dukes of Windsor, the King of Belgium Albert II, Rita Hayworth, Frank Sinatra, Ava Gardner, Elizabeth Taylor, Mary Pickford, Ingrid Bergman, Rock Hudson, Sofia Loren, Carlo Ponti, Kim Novak, Orson Welles, Boris Karloff, Raf Vallone, Marlon Brando, Peter Ustinov, Sean Connery, Anthony Quinn, Trevor Howard, Dirk Bogarde, John Mills, Claudia Cardinale, Raquel Welch, Xavier Cugat, Brigitte Bardot, the Argentine general Perón and the Rothschild barons, among others.

Among the events held at the hotel throughout its history, in 1966/67 the couturier Nina Ricci presented her Autumn-Winter haute couture collection in its salons, where singers such as Julio Iglesias have also performed, Antonio Machín, Raphael, Joan Manuel Serrat, Rita Pavone or Massiel, among others. It is located right on the beach, next to the 'La Carihuela' area noted for its seafood restaurants. The hotel has 192 guest rooms and 13 suites.

Frankie's Bar has been converted into an American cocktail bar, decorated with images of Frank Sinatra, which Sinatra frequented.

The Junior Suites Celebrities that are located on the seventh floor of the hotel's main building, that were allocated to celebrities and film stars staying at the hotel. The three Celebrities Junior Suites are each slightly different in design. They are furnished and decorated in a style typical of the late 1950s, when the hotel was originally built.

== Architecture ==
The hotel was built by the architects Manuel Muñoz Monasterio and Juan Jáuregui Briales in 1959–1960, who incorporated in its design the revisionist tendencies of the modern movement in those years, with the introduction of sets of colors, textures, wavy lines, etc.. The two grand staircases in the lobby set the appearance of the main facade, characterized by a semi-cylindrical body. On the upper floors, the rooms are distributed asymmetrically on both sides of the gallery. Completely renovated, it offers different types of accommodation with a modern décor that reflects the hotel's heritage from the 1950s.

== See also ==
- List of hotels in Spain
