= The Immaculate Conception of Los Venerables =

Painting by Bartolomé Esteban Murillo

- La Inmaculada Concepción de los Venerables (Spanish)
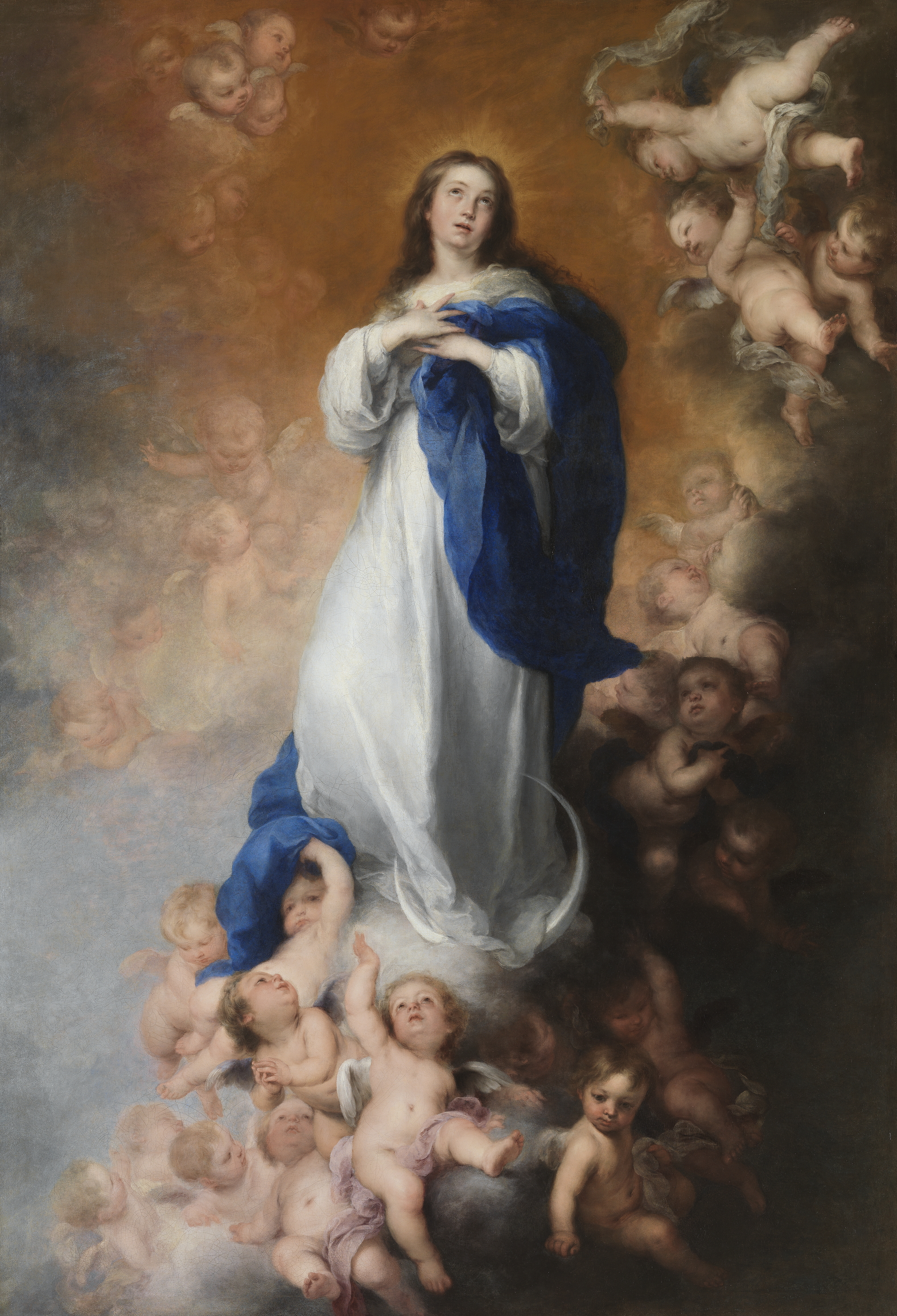
- Artist: Bartolomé Esteban Murillo
- Year: c. 1678
- Medium: Oil on canvas
- Dimensions: 274 cm × 190 cm (108 in × 75 in)
- Location: Museo del Prado, Madrid

The Immaculate Conception of Los Venerables or The Immaculate Conception of Soult (original titles La Inmaculada Concepción de los Venerables or La Inmaculada Concepción de Soult) is an oil painting by the Spanish artist Bartolomé Esteban Murillo. It was painted c. 1678 and measures 274 cm × 190 cm (108 in × 75 in). Looted by Marshal Jean-de-Dieu Soult in 1813 and taken to France, it was bought by the Louvre in 1852. It has been held by the Museo del Prado, Madrid, since 1941.

== Provenance ==
According to Juan Agustín Ceán Bermúdez, the work was commissioned from Bartolomé Esteban Murillo by Justino de Neve (1625–1685). De Neve was a canon of Seville Cathedral and ecclesiastical president of the Hospital de los Venerables in Seville. He commissioned the painting for his personal collection, and donated it to the chapel at the hospital in 1686. Belief in the Immaculate Conception had been on the rise in Spain since the 16th century and the country became its main defender, even fighting for it to be recognized as an official dogma of the Catholic Church, a goal that was eventually realized in 1854. The Immaculate Conception became a very important cultural symbol during this period, featured in many works of art.

In 1813, during the Peninsular War, the painting was looted by Marshal Jean-de-Dieu Soult and taken to France. Soult left behind the painting's frame which remains in the hospital to this day. The painting remained in Soult's possession until his death in 1851; the painting's alternative name is derived from his.

The painting was auctioned in 1852, and acquired by the Louvre Museum for 615,300 francs; reputedly the largest sum ever paid for a painting at that time. It was exhibited there until 1941, during which time Murillo's art fell out of fashion; as a result the Vichy Regime agreed to return it to Spain's Francisco Franco in an exchange of artwork, along with the Lady of Elche and several pieces of the Treasure of Guarrazar. In exchange, Spain's Museo del Prado gave the Louvre the Portrait of Mariana of Austria by Diego Velázquez. In 1981, the Prado's restoration specialist, Antonio Fernández Sevilla, carried out a careful superficial restoration of The Immaculate Conception of Los Venerables, in preparation for an exhibition dedicated to Murillo. A more in-depth restoration was carried out in 2007.

== Description ==
Murillo painted around two dozen versions of the Immaculate Conception, possibly the most of any Spanish painter at that time. In the majority, the Virgin Mary appears dressed in a white robe with a blue mantle, her hands crossed over her chest, with a crescent moon at her feet, and eyes upraised towards Heaven. Her contrapposto stance, with her right knee bent and her weight shifted to her left leg, adds to the undulating rhythm of the composition. A delicate sliver of a crescent moon is set at an angle for visual interest, and it encircles her foot, which is concealed for the sake of decorum beneath the pooling layers of white fabric. The Immaculate Conception of Los Venerables stands out from Murillo's others due to its triumphant tone. This effect is achieved through Murillo's use of light which creates a sense of movement from the bottom right to the top left of the painting. This upward movement, and the symbolism associated with the clouds and angels surrounding the principal figure, create a visual reference to the Assumption, connecting Mary's purity with her status as Christ's mother. In this composition, Murillo did not include several traditional elements of the Virgin's iconography—such as the Tower of David, the sealed fountain, or palm and cypress trees—possibly because these symbols were already featured in the painting's original frame in the Los Venerables Hospital, as described by Fernando de la Torre Farfán in the 18th century.
