= Gonzalo Mateo de Berrío =

Gonzalo Mateo de Berrío (Granada, 1554–1609) was a lawyer, playwright and poet from Granada. He is considered one of "the most outstanding dramatic poets of the end of the 16th century and the beginning of the next." He was also a lawyer. Mateo de Berrío is thought to have been born at a sugar mill somewhere in Granada, approximately in 1554. He is thought to have died sometime before October 24, 1609. He was the son of Bartolomé Luis de Berrío, who was a lawyer from Granada. Like his father, he studied law, receiving a bachelor's degree in law on April 22, 1572. Shortly after worked as a jurist.

== See also ==
- Pedro Espinosa
