= Torremolinos =

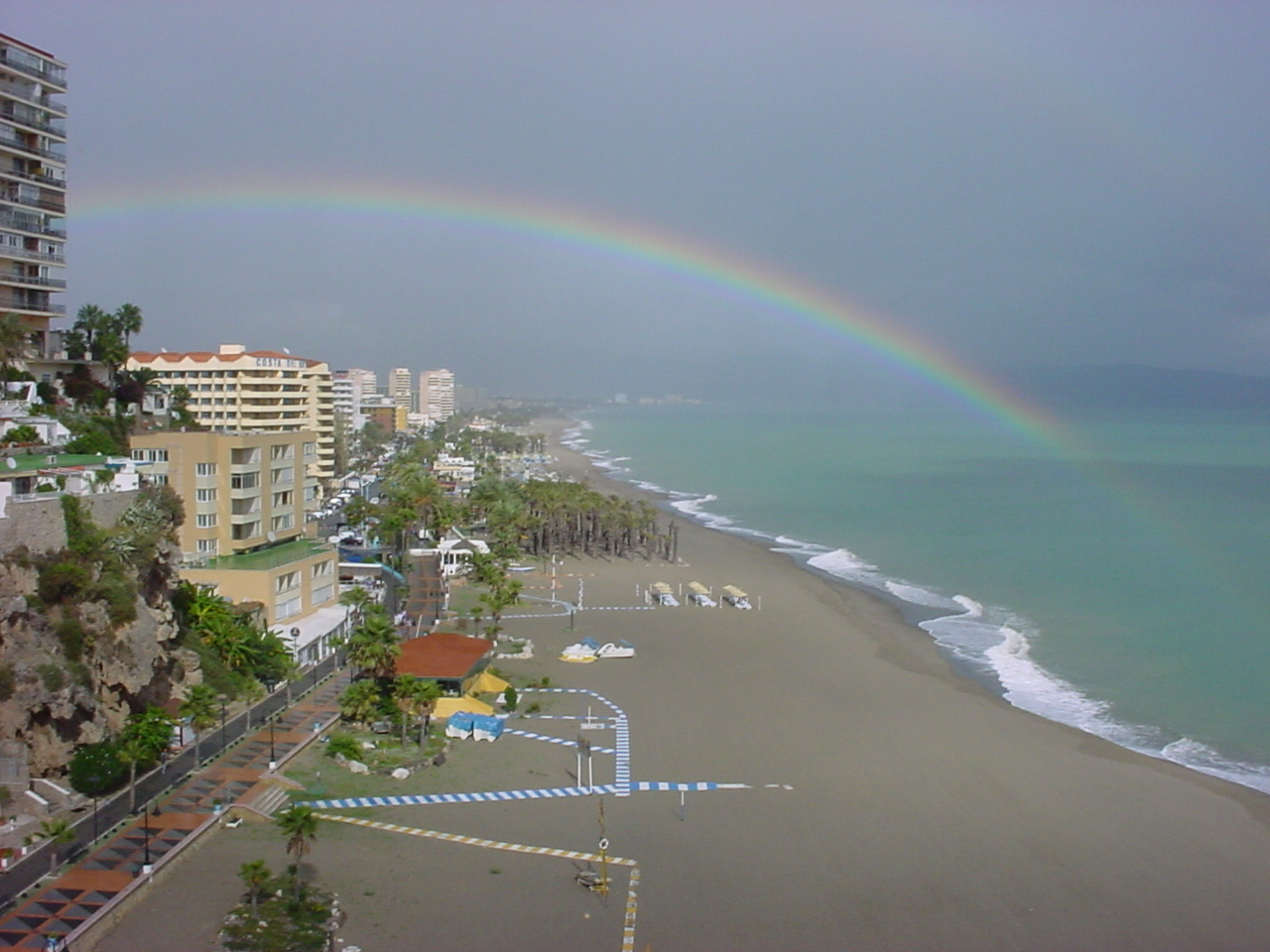

- Flag Coat of arms

- Location of Torremolinos

- Location within Andalusia Location within Spain
- Coordinates: 36°37′18.43″N 4°30′0.98″W
- Sovereign state: Spain
- Autonomous community: Andalusia
- Province: Málaga
- Comarca: Costa del Sol Occidental

Government
  - Mayor: Margarita Del Cid

Area
  - Total: 20 km^{2} (7.7 sq mi)

Population (2025-01-01)
  - Total: 71,329
  - Density: 3,600/km^{2} (9,200/sq mi)
- Demonym: Torremolinenses
- Time zone: UTC+1 (CET)
  - Summer (DST): UTC+2 (CEST)
- Postcode: 29620
- Website: www.torremolinos.es

Torremolinos (Spanish pronunciation: [toremoˈlinos]) is a municipality in Andalusia, southern Spain, west of Málaga. A poor fishing village before the growth in tourism began in the late 1950s, Torremolinos was the first of the Costa del Sol resorts to be developed and is still the most popular in the region.

On the western shore of the Bay of Málaga and in front of the Sierra de Mijas 13 km (8 miles) from Málaga, it is served by the A-7 motorway, which bypasses the city to the north, the Cercanías commuter train and Avanzabus.

In 2013, it had 69,389 inhabitants, making it the sixth largest city in the province. The township has an area of 20 km^{2} (7.7 sq mi).

Areas of the town are dotted with older high-rise residential buildings and hotels, but height limitations on new developments and a significant number of original old town properties have kept the town centre much more open than other popular resorts such as Benidorm and Fuengirola.

As the name Coast of the Sun implies, Torremolinos has long, dry summers with relatively low humidity, and mild winters with occasional, though heavy, rainfall. The town benefits in the summer from cool sea breezes predominantly coming from Africa, although this does mean a fair amount of Sahara dust. Temperatures normally hover around 30 °C (86 °F) in the summer and 17–19 °C (63–66 °F) in the winter. Torremolinos sometimes experiences a sea fog that goes as quickly as it appears.

The beach, which extends for nearly eight kilometres (five miles), has cycle and skating lanes alongside the fully illuminated promenade and features many chiringuitos (beach bars/restaurants). The eastern end of the beach, known as Los Álamos, has live dance music events throughout the summer. The easternmost parts of the beach have kitesurfing and windsurfing except under the flight path of the airport.

In addition to its tourism sector, Torremolinos is known locally for its vibrant and liberal nightlife, particularly its numerous bars and clubs catering to the LGBT community. Torremolinos co-hosted World Pride in 2017 in conjunction with Madrid and holds its own Pride in June, now the third largest in Spain.

== History ==
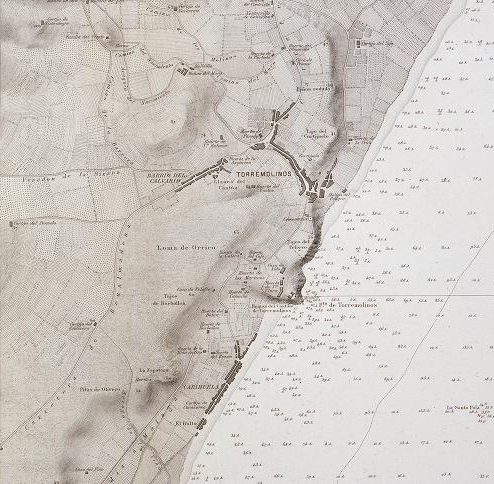
Map of Torremolinos from 1889

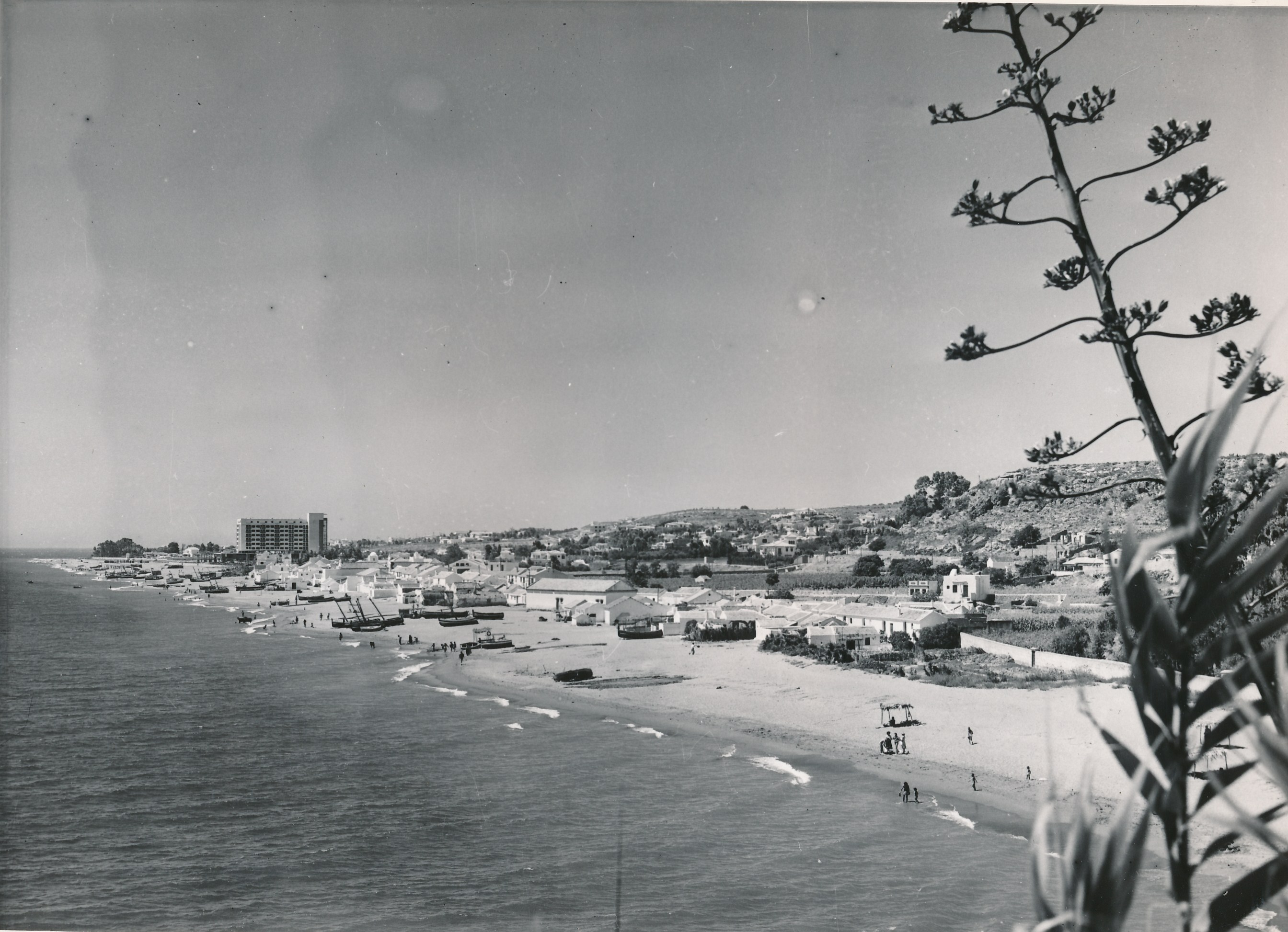
Torremolinos in January 1960

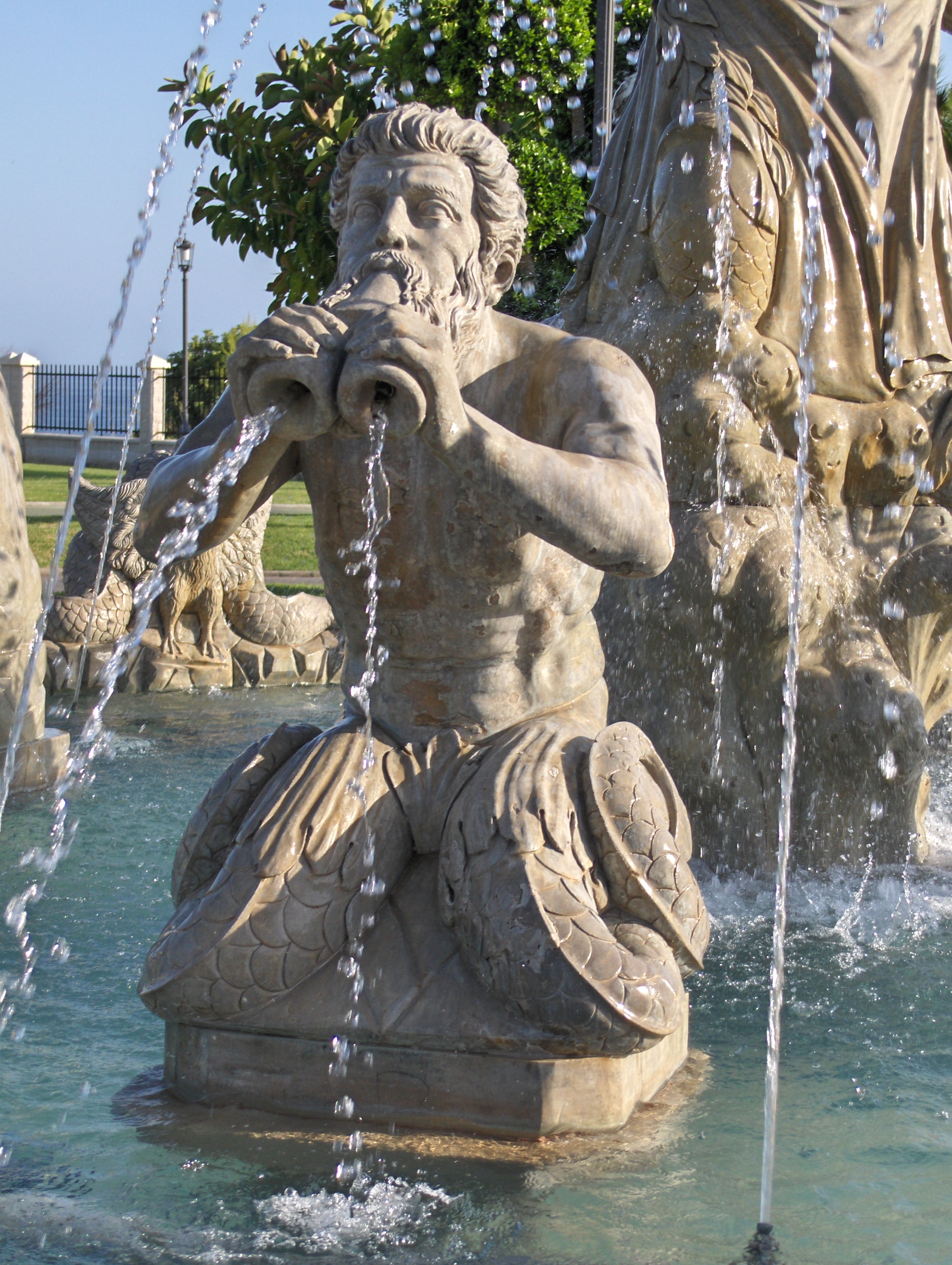
Sculpture in Parque de la Batería

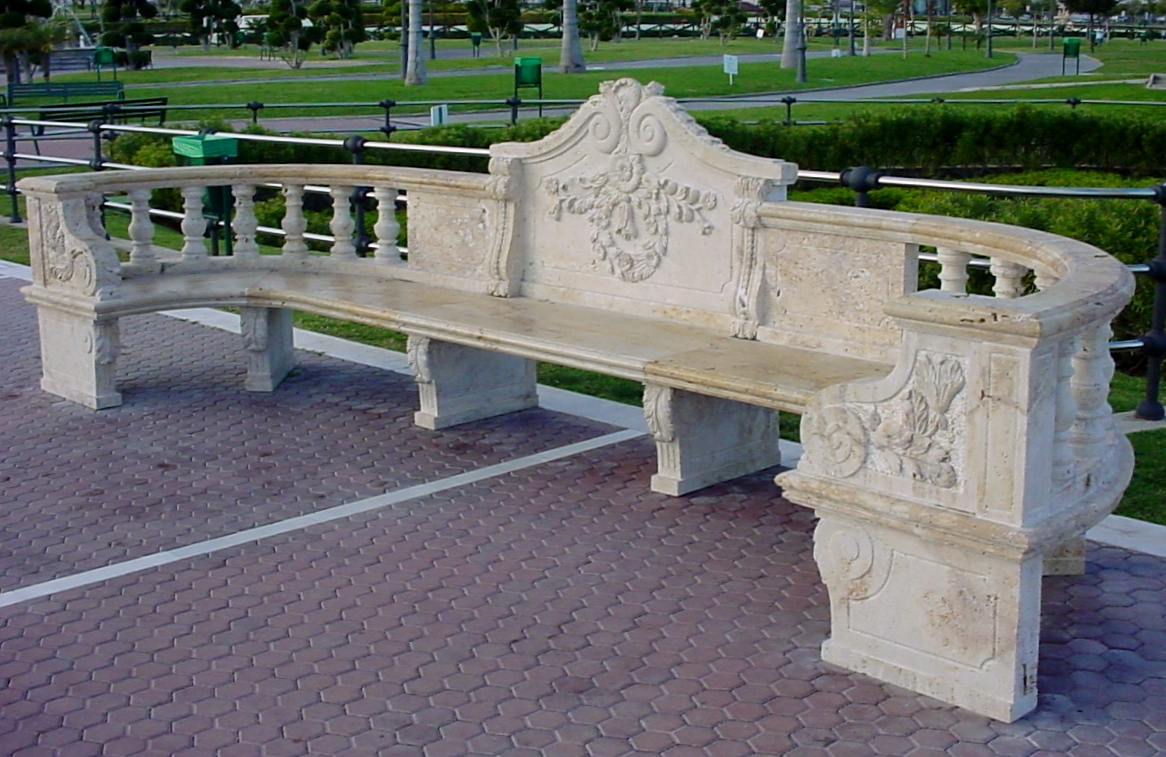
Stone bench in Torremolinos

Archaeological finds, including human and animal bones, tools, and pottery prove that the Torremolinos area was settled as early as the Neolithic Age. Some artifacts and tools are Neanderthal in origin, dated to nearly 150,000 years ago through radiocarbon dating. Nine skulls, some bones, clay pots, axe heads and arrows, ornaments of necklaces and bracelets, a ring and some animal bones discovered in the excavations of the caves: cueva del Tesoro (treasure cave), cueva tapada (cover cave), cueva del encanto (charm cave), cueva del tejón (badger cave). The study of these items places them at the Neolithic in the Quaternary period, around 5000 BCE. It is estimated that the skeletons found at the caves and at the cape of Torremolinos were 1.5 to 1.6 m (4 ft 11 in to 5 ft 3 in) tall.

According to the Egyptian Greek geographer Ptolemy, the Phoenicians had founded here a colony named Saduce, but the Romans are the most likely to have founded the current town, as shown by findings of edifices and a necropolis (from whose size it has been deduced that the settlement had around 2,000 inhabitants). They also built the road joining Cádiz with Málaga, passing through Torremolinos. In the 1990s a Roman necropolis was discovered with 23 graves at the "San Luis build" at Cantabria's square, which confirm the existence of a village of about 2000 years old.

With the Moorish conquest of Spain the mills from which the town takes its name were built. c.1300 CE the Muslim dynasty of the "Nazríes", which governed Málaga between the 13th and 15th centuries, built the defensive tower that can be seen at the end of San Miguel Street. After the fall of Granada, the town remained subject to North African pirate attacks which lasted from the 18th century; during the War of Spanish Succession, the town was attacked by an Anglo-Dutch flotilla under the British admiral George Rooke and almost entirely destroyed.

Torremolinos first appeared on the map of the Ensenada's Marques in 1748. A document dated 1769 lists a town population of 106. The mills and the city were rebuilt in the early 20th century, but the mill industry started to decline in the 1920s. It was largely replaced by an increasing tourist interest from 1928, particularly British visitors. In the 1950s, many celebrities visited Torremolinos such as Brigitte Bardot, Kirk Douglas, Charlton Heston, Ava Gardner, Marlon Brando, Orson Welles and Frank Sinatra.

In 1959, the Art Deco styled Hotel Pez Espada was opened, the first luxury hotel along the coast. In the following years, new hotels, nightclubs and other tourist-aimed establishments changed the face of the town and its beaches. By 1965, Torremolinos was already consolidated as a major tourist destination. The first gay bar in Spain, Toni's Bar, was founded in Torremolinos in 1962. The Spanish regime reacted to the free lifestyle of the city with arrests of homosexuals and other repressions during the 1970s.

In 2023, Torremolinos achieved record numbers of hotel occupancy and tourist spend, particularly from the LGBTQ events such as Madbear and Torremolinos Gay Pride as well as the Feria San Miquel which attracts over 200,000 visitors.

== Climate ==
Torremolinos has a subtropical Mediterranean climate (Köppen: Csa). The summers are hot and dry with relatively low humidity, and the winters are mild and humid, especially in November and December, with occasional, though heavy, rainfall. The town benefits in the summer from cool sea breezes predominately coming from Africa although this does mean a fair amount of Sahara dust. On rare occasions heavy dust storms known as Calima can discolour the normally pristine white buildings and even turn the sky orange. Day temperatures normally hover around 30 °C (86 °F) in July and August and the upper teens in the winter. In the summer, Torremolinos sometimes experiences a sea fog that goes as quickly as it appears. The phenomenon, known as 'Taró', was reported as far back as Phoenician times and is a type of sea advection fog.

Climate data for Torremolinos (2009-2025), extremes (2009-present)
Month	Jan	Feb	Mar	Apr	May	Jun	Jul	Aug	Sep	Oct	Nov	Dec	Year
Record high °C (°F)	27.8 (82.0)	27.6 (81.7)	30.8 (87.4)	32.9 (91.2)	34.6 (94.3)	39.0 (102.2)	40.6 (105.1)	42.0 (107.6)	35.8 (96.4)	36.1 (97.0)	31.0 (87.8)	25.5 (77.9)	42.0 (107.6)
Mean daily maximum °C (°F)	17.7 (63.9)	17.9 (64.2)	19.3 (66.7)	21.2 (70.2)	24.4 (75.9)	27.9 (82.2)	30.7 (87.3)	30.9 (87.6)	27.9 (82.2)	24.8 (76.6)	20.5 (68.9)	18.3 (64.9)	23.5 (74.2)
Daily mean °C (°F)	13.9 (57.0)	14.2 (57.6)	15.5 (59.9)	17.3 (63.1)	20.1 (68.2)	23.6 (74.5)	26.3 (79.3)	26.9 (80.4)	24.1 (75.4)	20.9 (69.6)	16.9 (62.4)	14.8 (58.6)	19.5 (67.2)
Mean daily minimum °C (°F)	10.2 (50.4)	10.4 (50.7)	11.6 (52.9)	13.3 (55.9)	15.9 (60.6)	19.3 (66.7)	21.9 (71.4)	22.8 (73.0)	20.3 (68.5)	17.0 (62.6)	13.3 (55.9)	11.2 (52.2)	15.6 (60.1)
Record low °C (°F)	3.0 (37.4)	2.7 (36.9)	6.2 (43.2)	7.3 (45.1)	9.4 (48.9)	13.3 (55.9)	16.7 (62.1)	17.9 (64.2)	14.6 (58.3)	9.3 (48.7)	6.1 (43.0)	6.0 (42.8)	2.7 (36.9)
Average precipitation mm (inches)	49.1 (1.93)	65.8 (2.59)	97.9 (3.85)	44.7 (1.76)	14.9 (0.59)	2.4 (0.09)	0.1 (0.00)	1.0 (0.04)	17.5 (0.69)	61.8 (2.43)	78.5 (3.09)	82.3 (3.24)	516 (20.3)
Average precipitation days (≥ 1 mm)	4.9	4.5	7.3	4.9	2.5	0.7	0.0	0.2	1.8	4.1	5.1	4.7	40.7
Source: Agencia Estatal de Meteorología (AEMET OpenData)

Climate data for Torremolinos, Spain
Month	Jan	Feb	Mar	Apr	May	Jun	Jul	Aug	Sep	Oct	Nov	Dec	Year
Mean daily maximum °C (°F)	17.9 (64.2)	18.6 (65.5)	20.3 (68.5)	21.6 (70.9)	23.9 (75.0)	27.1 (80.8)	29.2 (84.6)	30.3 (86.5)	26.9 (80.4)	23.6 (74.5)	20.5 (68.9)	18.4 (65.1)	23.2 (73.7)
Daily mean °C (°F)	13.8 (56.8)	14.5 (58.1)	15.9 (60.6)	17.1 (62.8)	19.4 (66.9)	22.6 (72.7)	24.7 (76.5)	24.8 (76.6)	22.8 (73.0)	19.7 (67.5)	16.6 (61.9)	14.6 (58.3)	18.9 (66.0)
Mean daily minimum °C (°F)	9.7 (49.5)	10.3 (50.5)	11.5 (52.7)	12.6 (54.7)	14.9 (58.8)	18.0 (64.4)	20.2 (68.4)	20.6 (69.1)	18.6 (65.5)	15.7 (60.3)	12.7 (54.9)	10.7 (51.3)	14.6 (58.3)
Average precipitation mm (inches)	91.2 (3.59)	82.5 (3.25)	68.7 (2.70)	59.4 (2.34)	27.8 (1.09)	7.6 (0.30)	0.6 (0.02)	6.3 (0.25)	27.7 (1.09)	78.9 (3.11)	130.7 (5.15)	134.1 (5.28)	715.5 (28.17)
Source: World Meteorological Organization (WMO)

== Events ==
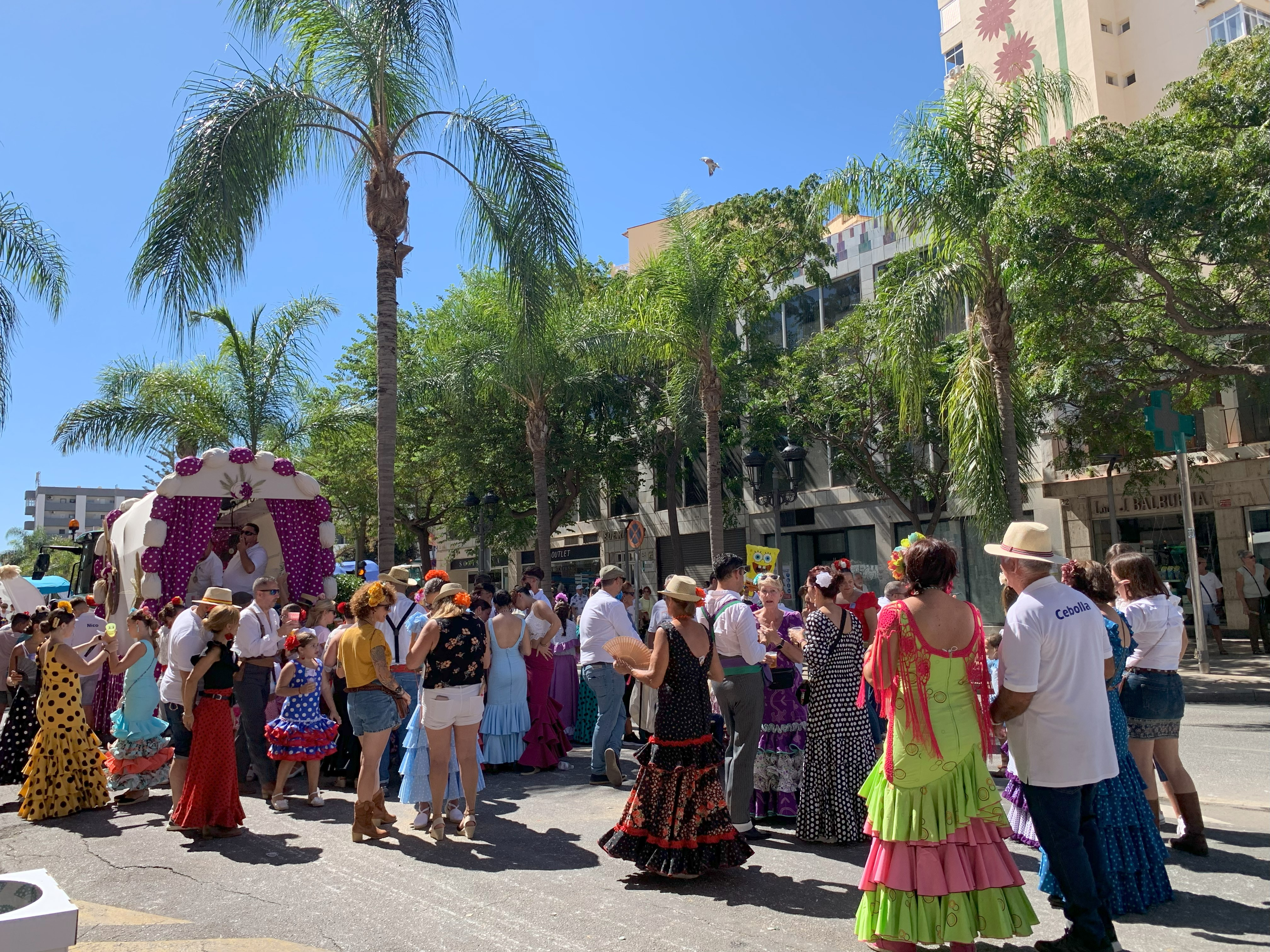
Feria de Torremolinos 2023

As a popular tourist destination on the Costa del Sol, with over 1 million visitors and 5 million bed stays in 2023 Torremolinos has many events and festivals throughout the year.

On the first Saturday in June Torremolinos hosts the Pride Parade.

At the end of September Torremolinos has the Feria de San Miguel, a celebration that includes parades, music and dance shows happening both in the fairgrounds and in the city centre for up to a week.

In mid October each year the Komando Motorbike Festival takes place with approximately 15,000 bikers attending the Palacio de Congresso.

== Leisure ==
Torremolinos is home to the largest water park on the Costa del Sol. Called Aqualand, it is open from May to October. Next door is the Crocodile Park, which is open year-round. Nearby is a large wooded area with public barbecue facilities and seating.

The botanical gardens, Molino de Inca, are located next to the municipal-run Garden centre which backs onto Aqualand.

The local radio station is Radio Planeta on FM 92.8 and only plays dance music in English but with Spanish advertising.

A free English paper, Sur in English, is printed every Friday.

Torremolinos has several large municipal-owned venues, including a conference, exhibition and convention centre, the Palacio de Congresos, the auditorium Prince of Asturias, and the Pablo Ruiz Picasso cultural centre.

== Shopping ==
Torremolinos has some early shopping centres built in the 1960s and 1970s most of which are sparsely populated due to unmotivated landowners and difficulties with disabled access.

The main tourist shops are on Calle San Miguel, Plaza Costa del Sol, the stairs down to the beach and the beach road itself.

In 2016 approval was given for a shopping, hotel, casino and leisure complex to be built on land next to Aqualand and the A7 motorway and primary ring roads. Costing in excess of 800 million euros, it will be the largest development of its type in the Mediterranean, however the project has been delayed.

== Sports ==
Torremolinos has many sporting complexes, including two Olympic swimming pools, track and field facilities, tennis courts, racquet ball courts, as well as football pitches; this, combined with the climate, led to over 900 international athletes training in the town in 2023.

During the warmer months, the city offers classes for children, as well as adults, in various physical activities such as Aerosalsa, an activity that combines aerobics with Latin dances and salsa, body tonic, indoor cycling, competitive swimming, children's swimming, functional training, gap, adult swimming, paddle, pilates, basketball and tennis. The covered tennis courts, unusual in the area, have been frequented by Novak Djokovic.

== Transport ==
The coastal towns from Malaga through to Fuengirola are served by Cercanías commuter trains and the fares are divided by zone.

Málaga Airport is 10 minutes away by train, which runs every 20 minutes. It is the 3rd busiest airport in Spain carrying over 16 million passengers annually.

Torremolinos is served by 5 rail stations, all of them wheelchair-friendly including the new refurbished main station in the town centre square of La Nogalera, which now has two escalators and lifts following an investment of €7.5 million.

== Famous residents ==
- Danny La Rue, World-famous female impersonator
- Damian Quintero, Karate Champion of the World
- Alvin Karpis (1907–1979), Depression-era outlaw, lived his last years in Torremolinos after being released from prison by US authorities
- Gustavo Thorlichen, photographer of Perón and Che Guevara
- Nina Zhivanevskaya, bronze medal winner for Spain in 100-metre backstroke at the 2000 Summer Olympics
- Brendan Sheerin, presenter (tour guide) on the British television reality show, Coach Trip

== See also ==
- List of municipalities in Málaga
