= Hotel Sevilla (Algeciras) =

Hotel in Algeciras, Spain

Coordinates: 36°07′38″N 5°26′43″W

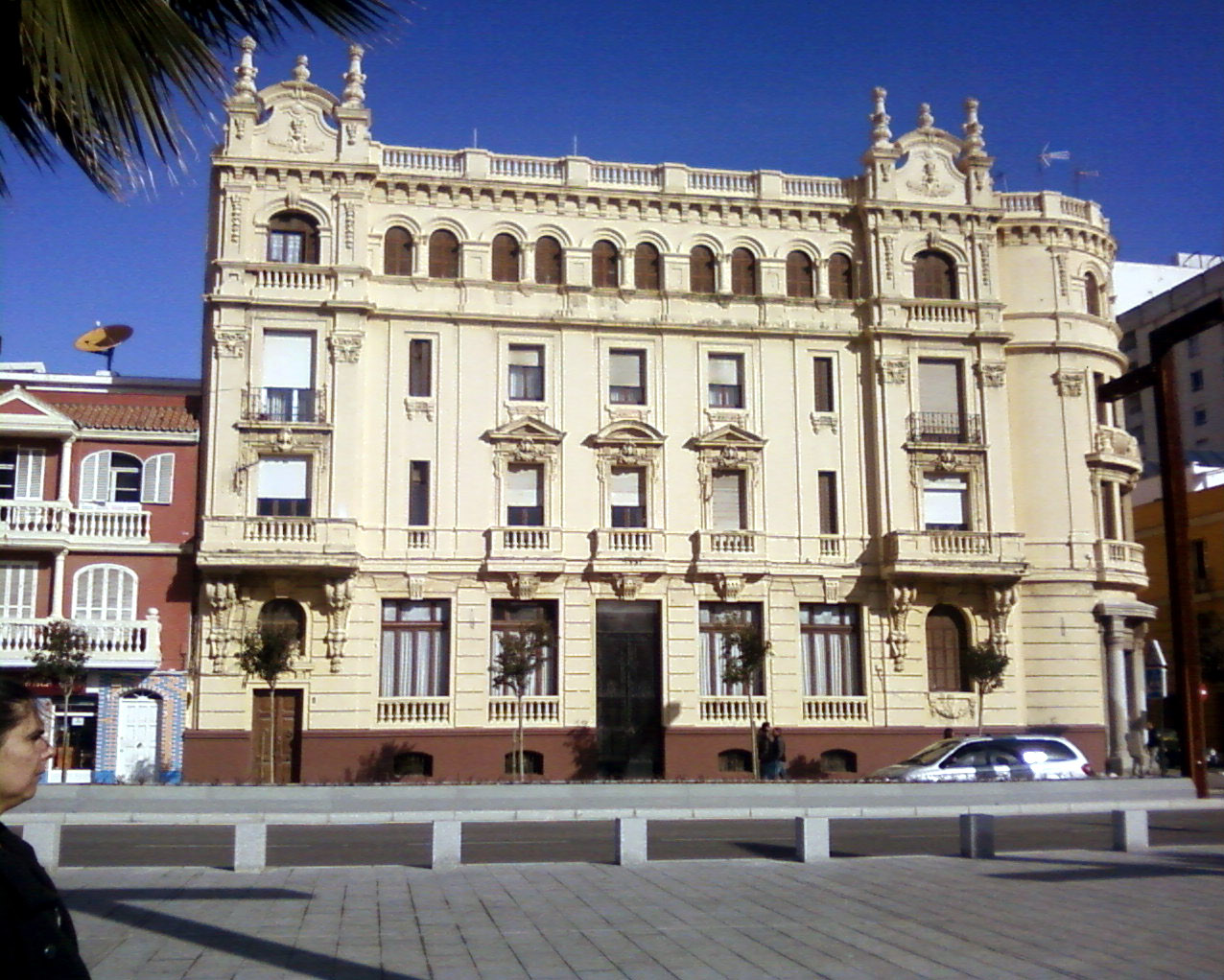

Hotel Sevilla is a historic hotel in Algeciras, Spain. Its construction took place between 1922 and 1925 by the Madrid-based architect Emilio Antón. It is built in the neo-baroque style, with four floors. The balconies and balusters contain decorative floral motifs.

Today the building is home to the González-Gaggero family and is protected as a remarkable architectural monument under Grade II of the Plan General de Ordenación Urbana (General Urban Plan of Algeciras).
