= Hotel París (Huelva) =

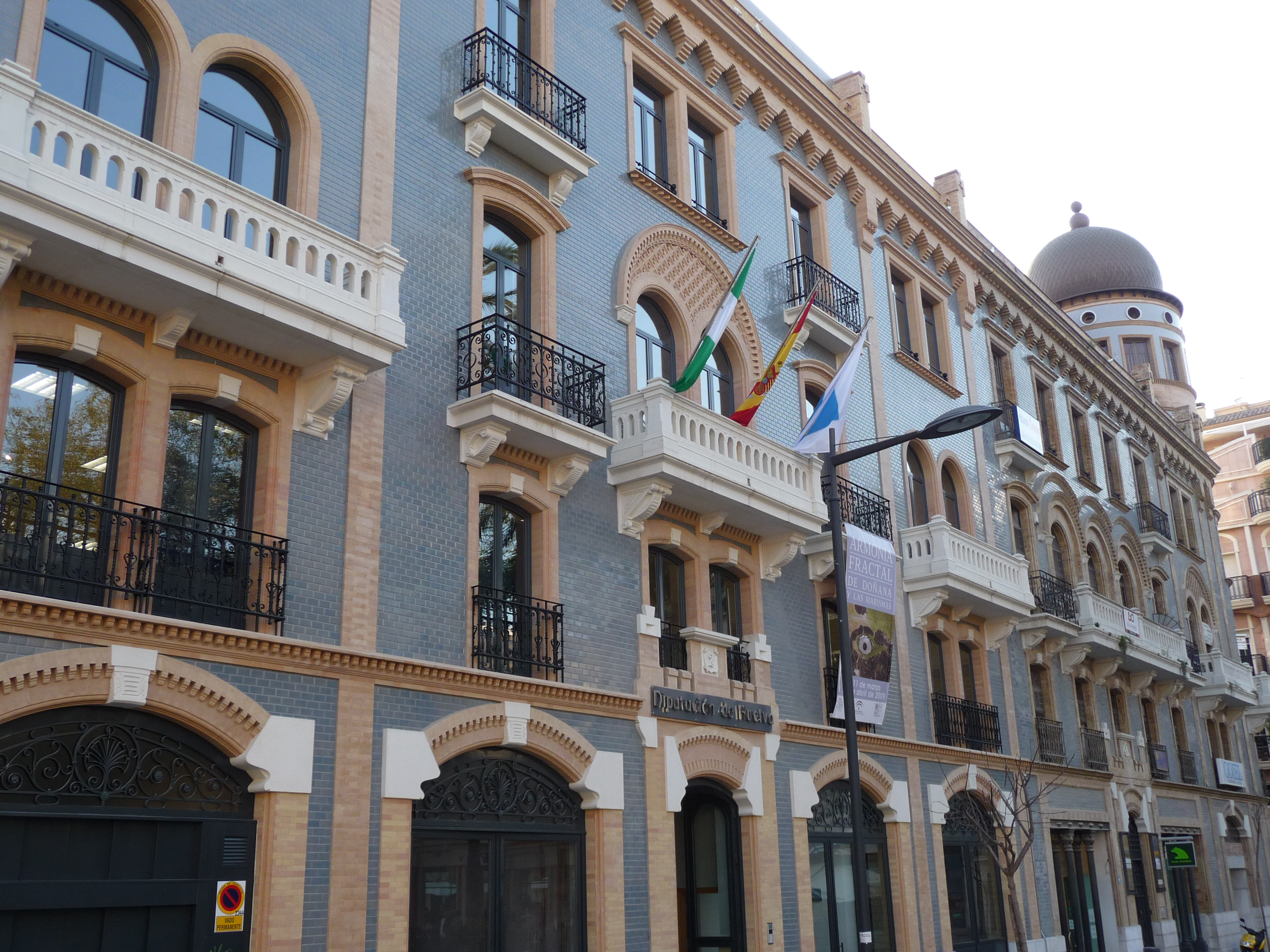
- Interactive map of the Hotel París area

General information
- Location: Huelva, Andalusia, Spain
- Coordinates: 37.25700009°N 6.95171123°W

Hotel París, also Casa de la Bola, is a hotel in Huelva, Spain. It is located in the heart of the capital and in the rear of the Palace of the Duke of Medina-Sidonia. It was commissioned by Antonio García Ramos and architect Francisco Monís y Morales in 1907. Monís designed a building divided into two independent sectors. The number 1 building was designed as for homes and businesses while the number 2 as the hotel itself. The facade contains elements of both classical and modernist styles. In 2009 the Number 1 building was completely rebuilt, retaining only the original facade and adding two floors as an annex building. Today the building serves as an exhibition centre in the Provincial Council of Huelva while the second is aimed at commercial premises.

== See also ==
- List of hotels in Spain
