= Hotel Anglo-Hispano =

Building in Algeciras, Spain

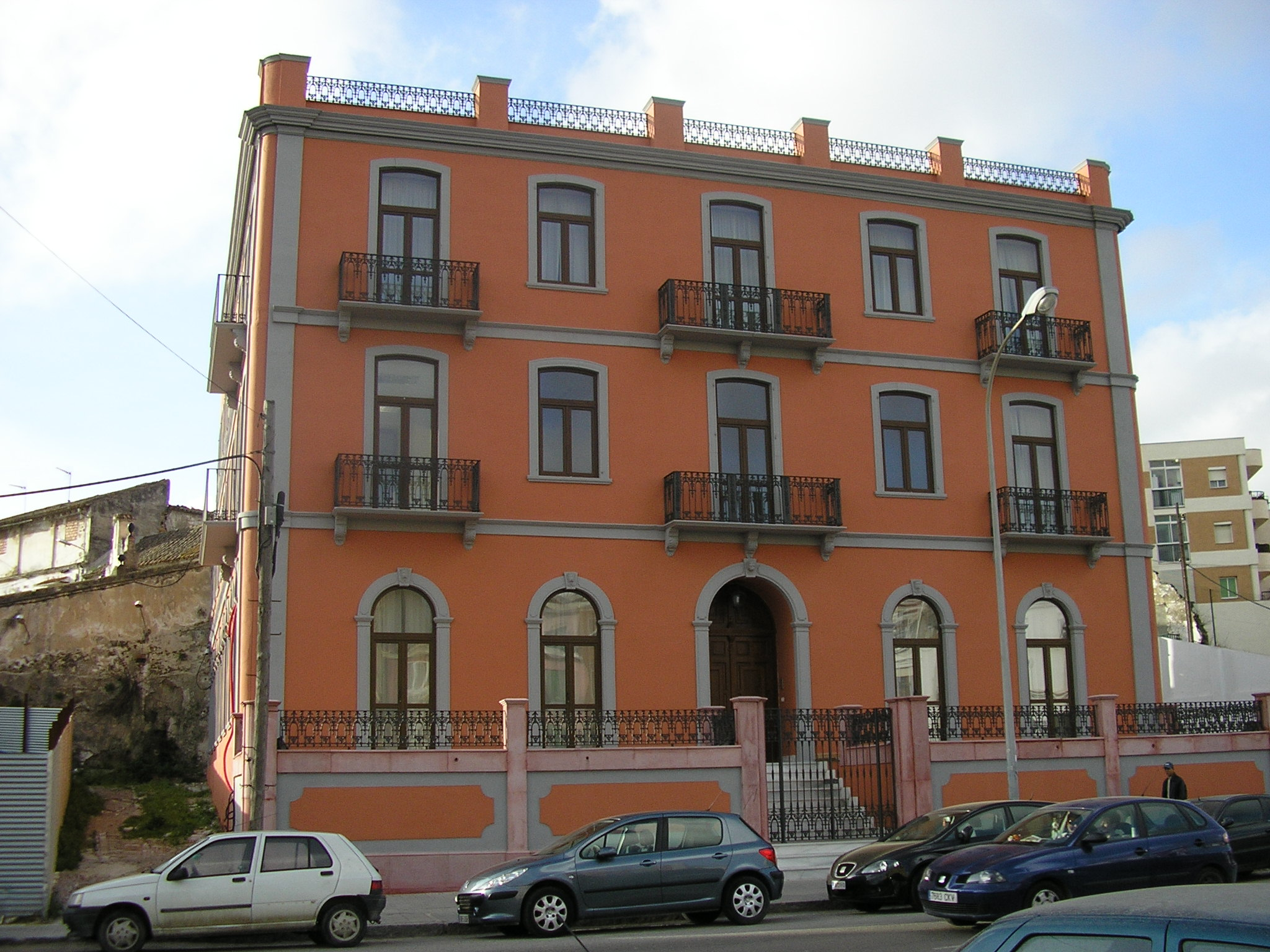
- The building

- Location within Andalusia

General information
- Location: Algeciras, Andalusia, Spain
- Coordinates: 36°7′35″N 5°26′44″W

Hotel Anglo-Hispano is a building in Algeciras, Spain. It was originally used as a hotel and is now used as an office space.

== History ==
This building operated as a hotel from the late nineteenth century to the 1980s. It was the scene of several major events in the history of Algeciras. In 1906, along with the nearby Hotel Reina Cristina, it served much of the delegations attending the Conference of Algeciras. It underwent extensive restoration between 2007 and 2010 and is built in the eclectic style.

== Architecture ==
The building has a three-story layout encompassing a central courtyard, providing access to the rooms via staircases. The facade of the ground floor features doors and window lintels with modest decorative elements that correspond to the old hall. In contrast, the rooms on the second and third floors have undecorated windows and colonial-style balconies. The building's terrace features a metal handrail supported by several piles of masonry, which is a common element found throughout the city. The left side of the building is accessible from the Coral Courtyard, a collection of homes constructed on the ancient gate of the medina Arabian Sea. Nearby, on the same street, is the modern Kursaal building designed by Guillermo Pérez Villalta, currently serving as an exhibition hall.

== Restoration ==
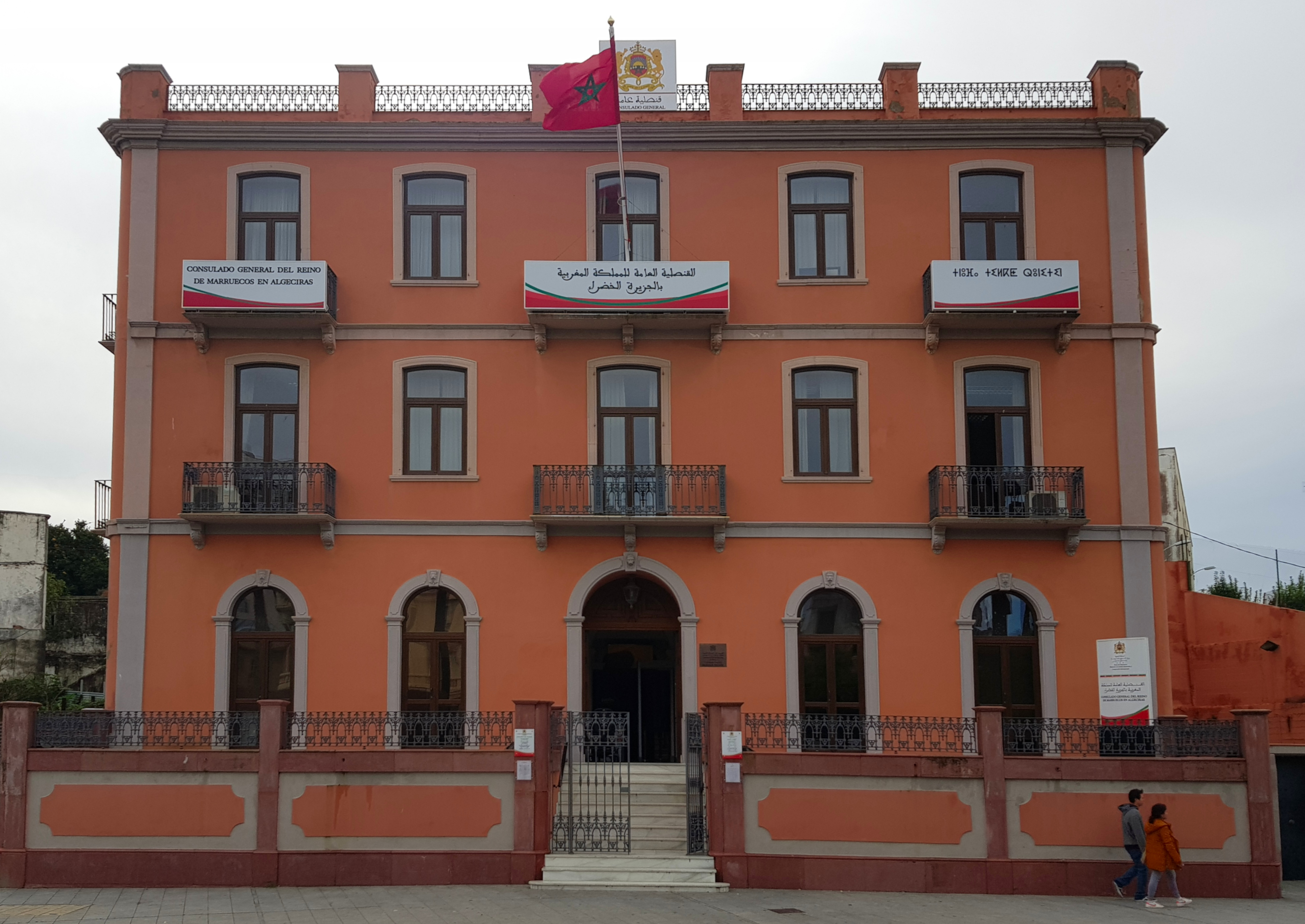
Used as Moroccan Consulate General, 2018.

In 2007, the municipality of Algeciras made a specific amendment to the General Urban Plan (General Plan) in order to change the uses allowed for a building occupying this building plot. The purpose of this change was, given the high costs of restoration of the building, was to allow the purchase of the building by a private company that would take over the work. Thus the management of the Hotel Anglo-Hispanic went from a plot for public use to private use. This made possible the restoration of the building in 2008 and its transformation into an office building occupied by a law firms called Anglo-Hispanic. The recovery of the building was accompanied by development of the mouth of the river with the construction of an urban park called Paseo del Rio de la Miel. This opened in 2010 and helped the value of the building and adjacent areas.
