= Gran Hotel Almería =

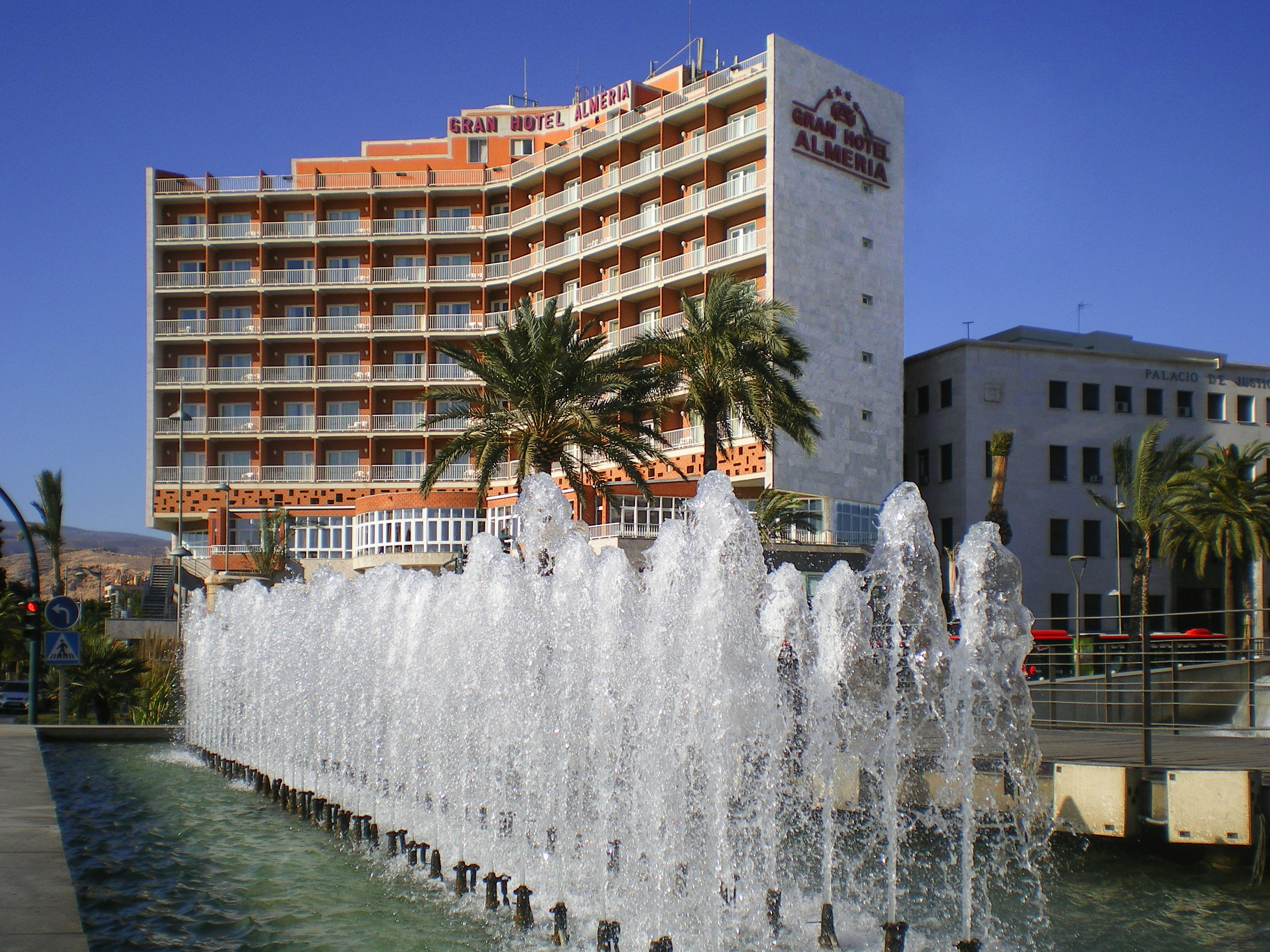
- Gran Hotel Almería in 2009
- Interactive map of the Gran Hotel Almería area

General information
- Location: Almeria, Nunmber 8 of Reina Regente Avenue (barrio de Nicolás Salmerón)
- Coordinates: 36.8344°N 2.4637°W
- Opening: 6 December 1967
- Owner: Banco Santander
- Management: Antonio Fernández

Design and construction
- Architect: Fernando Cassinello

Website
- ohtelsalmeria.es

Gran Hotel Almería is a four-star hotel located in the Port of Almeria. It was owned first by Vita Hoteliers, then by Banco Popular and finally by Banco Santander.

The urban spatial structure was designed by Fernando Cassinello, and it was the first four-star hotel in Almeria. From 2006 Antonio Fernández is the director.

On 23 December 2014 it closed the first time along with Hotel Embajador to remodel the building. It was scheduled to reopen in the summer of 2015. It was opened in October 2016 to film the British TV series Crossing the Border. In July 2018 Ohtels was in charge of the hotel, and finally it was opened in September 2018.

The hotel was visited by some celebrities like filmmakers Sergio Leone, Steven Spielberg, Harrison Ford, Sofia Loren, Clint Eastwood, Lee Van Cleef, Brigitte Bardot, Raquel Welch, David Carradine, Faye Dunaway, Catherine Deneuve, Charles Bronson and Burt Lancaster; politicians SSMM Juan Carlos I of Spain and Sofia of Greece, José María Aznar, José Luis Rodríguez Zapatero, Felipe González, Adolfo Suárez and Leopoldo Calvo-Sotelo; and musician Ringo Starr.
