= Gran Hotel Guadalpin Banús =

Hotel in Marbella, Spain

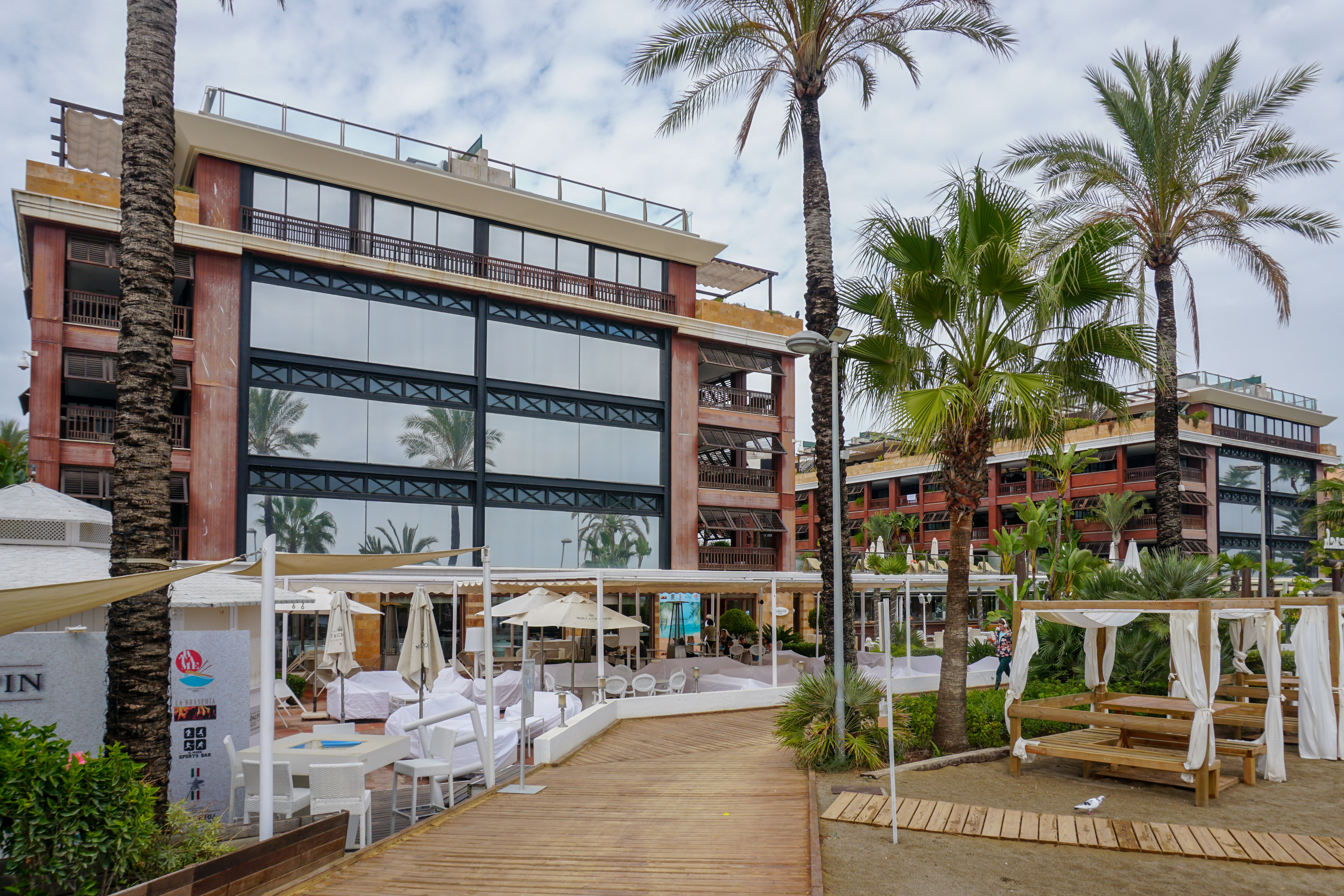

- Location within Andalusia

General information
- Location: Puerto Banús, Marbella, Spain
- Coordinates: 36°29′0″N 4°57′53″W

The Gran Hotel Guadalpin Banús is a luxury five-star hotel in Puerto Banús, Marbella, Spain. The hotel is situated on the beach and contains 181 rooms. The hotel is served by the Lorea restaurant specializing in Basque cuisine, and the bars Sofia Cócteles and Pool Bar.

The hotel was built between 2002 and 2005 by the developer Aifos. Aifos went bankrupt in 2009 and was liquidated in 2014. 40% of the hotel was sold to Puerto Banús, but its past debts remained a burden for years.

During the summer of 2024, the partial closure of the hotel was ordered by a local court after its employees launched a long strike to protest against minimal hiring conditions during low seasons.

Caja Rural and SPV Spain are the hotel's main shareholders.

== See also ==
- List of hotels in Spain
