= Convento de la Magdalena =

Building in Andalusia, Spain

Coordinates: 37°0′16″N 4°36′11″W

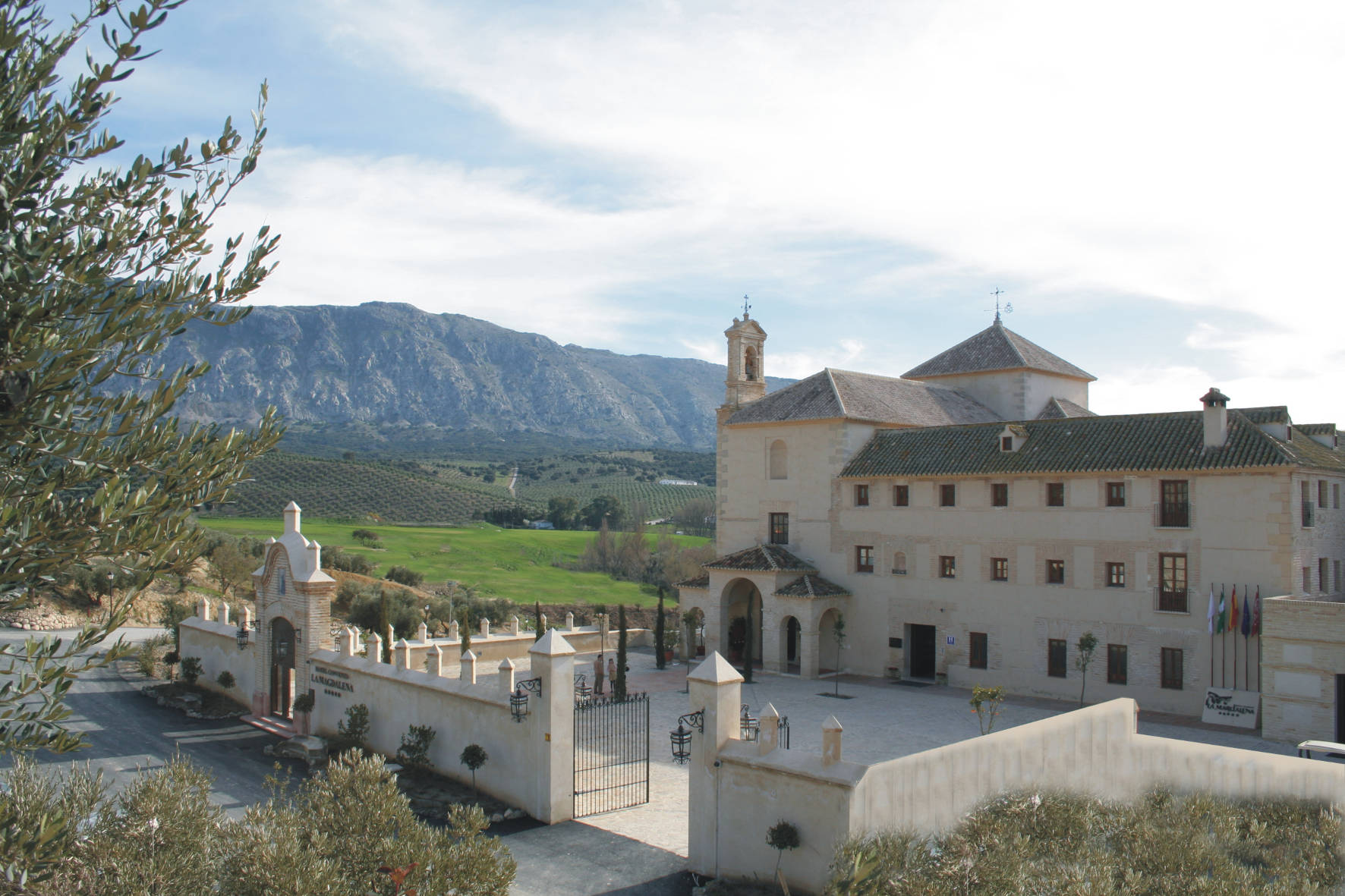
Hotel Convento La Magdalena

Convento de la Magdalena was a convent, now a hotel, situated to the southwest of the town of Antequera, Province of Málaga, Spain. Its history was known through the translation of an 18th-century monk's manuscript. In 2009 it was converted into a luxury hotel, known as the Hotel Convento La Magdalena, with 21 rooms. Olive groves and mills in the vicinity reflect the occupation of people in the area. A stream, Arroyo de la Magdalena, flows nearby.

== History ==
The convent was established in 1570 by the merchant, Ildefonso Alvarez, who possessed an altarpiece of the Virgin Magdalena. Alvarez took refuge in the area's caves and lived like a hermit. In the following three years, he struggled to pay his debts and eventually attracted the attention of the Christian community who helped him. In 1585, construction started on a small chapel in the area. In 1648 the place became renowned for the healing from the plague by Father Cardenas, a pastor of Seville who had journeyed to the little church. Fame and abundant alms sowed corruption among hermits. In 1685, the hermits were expelled by order of the Bishop of Málaga. The order of the Discalced Franciscans took over the management of the church in 1691 and began construction of the new convent. In 1761 the guardian of the convent was reported to be Fr. Juan Gomez. The convent was abandoned in the mid-19th century.

== Hotel ==
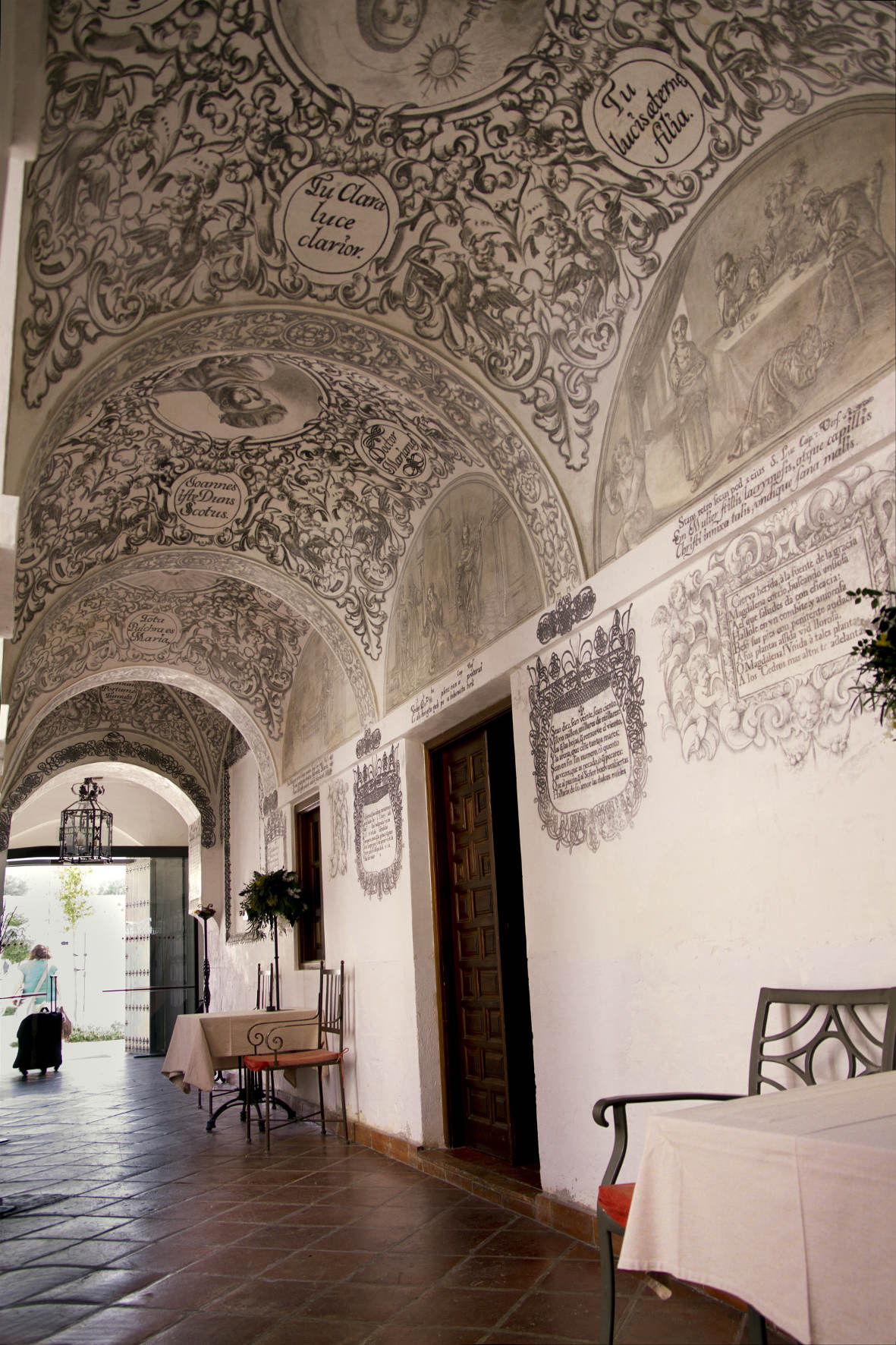
Frescoes

In 2009, the convent underwent a careful restoration and became a five star hotel that left many of the original features of the Franciscan convent. Many frescoes still remain on the arched ceilings and walls. Hotel Convento La Magdalena is part of the Antequera Golf Group and includes the Antequera Golf Course with 18 holes. It has 21 rooms, including 13 double rooms, 5 suites and 1 Royal suite. Several rooms have their own terrace and access to an organic garden. The rooms are all furnished with a flat screen TV and air conditioning and heating.

The hotel is served by the "Refectorio" restaurant under chef David Muñoz, formerly of elBulli, serving traditional Andalusian and Mediterranean cuisine. The hotel also contains the "Tetería Arabe", the "Piano Bar" which serves coffee, and the "Bodegas" bar, noted for its karaoke and flamenco dancing.
