= Montesol Experimental Hotel =

Montesol Experimental
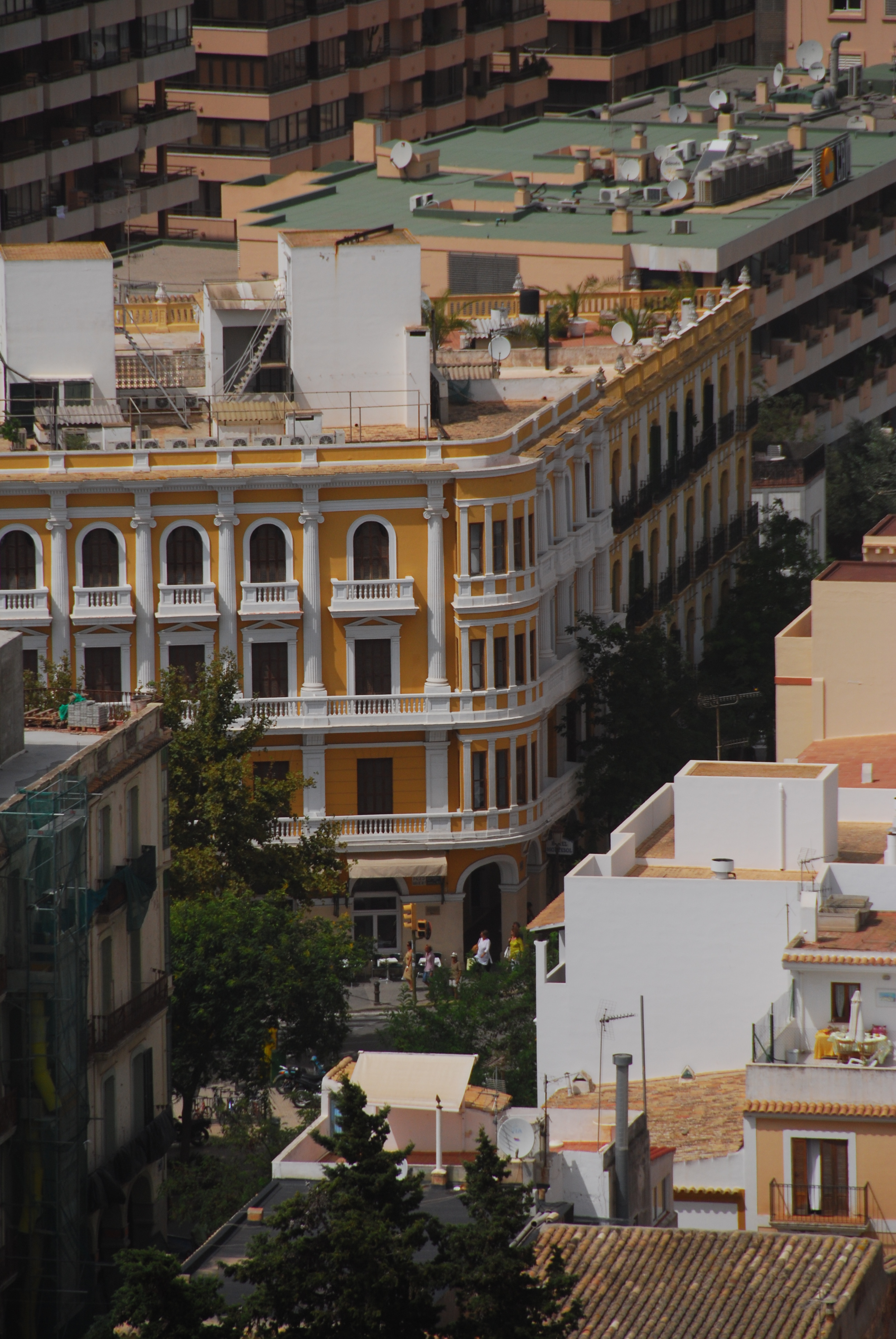

- Location within Ibiza

General information
- Location: Ibiza, Balearic Islands, Spain., Passeig de Vara de Rey 2
- Coordinates: 38.909986°N 1.434715°E
- Opening: June 4th 1933

Technical details
- Floor count: 4

Design and construction
- Developer: Joan Gómez Ripoll

Other information
- Number of rooms: 33
- Parking: Valet

Website
- Official Website

The Montesol Experimental is a historic hotel in Ibiza Town, Ibiza, characterised by its white and yellow color.

== History ==
The Gran Hotel Ibiza was designed by Joan Gómez Ripoll and opened in June 1933 as the second hotel on Ibiza. It was commandeered by the Army after the outbreak of the Spanish Civil War in 1936, and remained under their control until the end of World War II in 1945. After the war, it reopened as the Hotel Ibiza. It became a popular resort destination in the 1950s and was renamed the Hotel Montesol in 1958. In 2002, the structure was officially listed as a Bien de Interés Cultural (BIC) by the Spanish Ministry of Culture.

The hotel closed for renovations in 2014 and reopened in 2016 as the Gran Hotel Montesol Ibiza. It was part of Hilton's Curio Collection until 2020, when it closed due to the COVID-19 pandemic. It was sold in 2021 to the Experimental hospitality group, and renovated over two years, reopening in 2023 as Montesol Experimental.
