= Diagonal Mar i el Front Marítim del Poblenou =

Coordinates: 41°24′34.56″N 2°12′58.7″E

- Neighbourhood of Barcelona
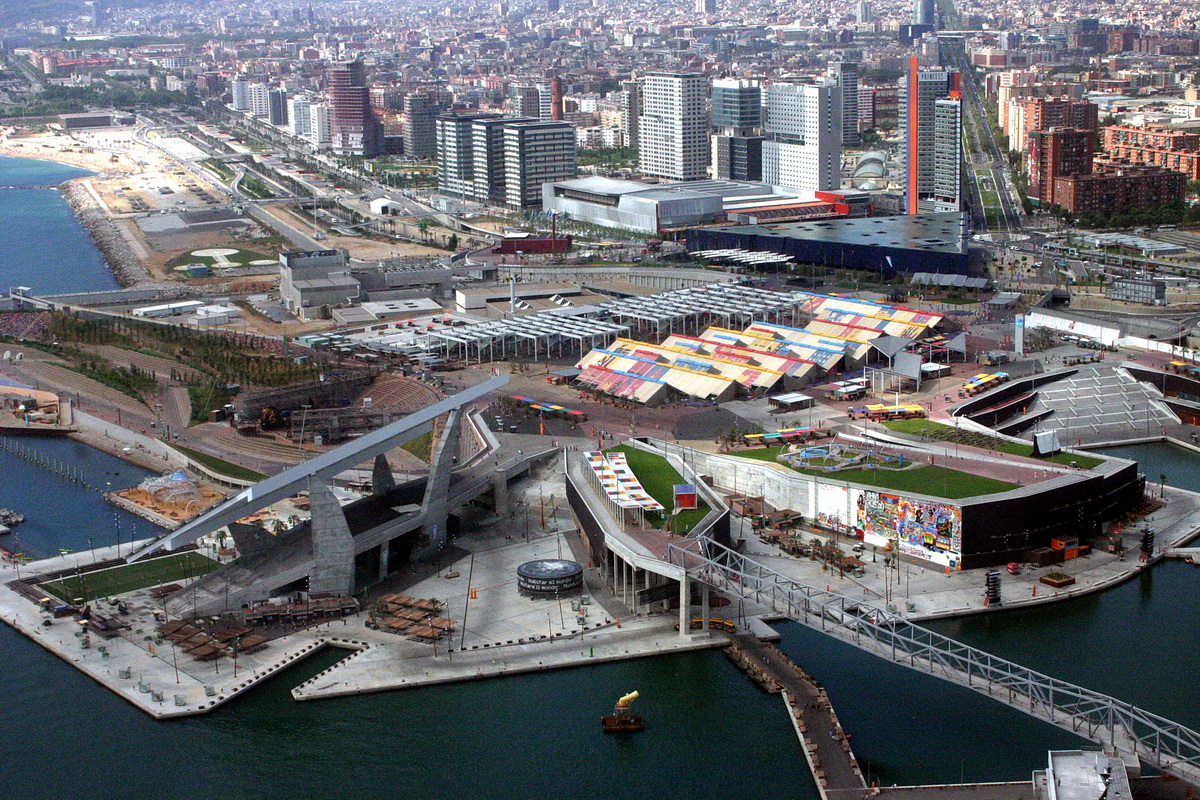
- Diagonal Mar during the 2004 Cultural Forum
- Interactive map of Diagonal Mar i el Front Marítim del Poblenou
- Country: Spain
- Autonomous Community: Catalonia
- Province: Barcelona
- Comarca: Barcelonès
- Municipality: Barcelona
- District: Sant Martí

Area
  - Total: 1.237 km^{2} (0.478 sq mi)

Population
  - Total: 13,453
  - Density: 10,880/km^{2} (28,170/sq mi)
- Website: Official website

Diagonal Mar i el Front Marítim del Poblenou (Catalan: [diəɣuˈnal ˈmaɾ i əl ˈfɾom məˈɾitim dəl ˌpɔbːləˈnɔw]; "Diagonal Mar and the Poblenou Seafront") is a neighborhood in the Sant Martí district of Barcelona, Catalonia, Spain.

The area between the seafront, Sant Adrià de Besòs and the Besòs river was previously made up of slums and poor areas surrounding the neighbourhoods of La Mina, El Maresme and Poblenou. Under the new name Diagonal Mar, in reference to its proximity to the sea and Avinguda Diagonal, renovation started taking place in the late 1990s. Still ongoing, this has been one of the most ambitious urban regeneration schemes, and also one of the most controversial and a perceived departure from Barcelona's well-established urban model. The real estate company Hines was in charge of most relevant decisions about urbanism in the area, although it was ESPAIS Promocions Immobiliaries, a local real estate developer, who developed the majority of the residential towers, including Illa de la Llum, Illa del Bosc, Illa del Cell and Illa del Mar. This has been criticised by renowned local architects such as Oriol Bohigas, Juli Capellas or Josep Maria Montaner or urbanism scholar Llàtzer Moix. Most renovation in the area was ready in time for the 2004 Cultural Forum, which took place in the International Convention Centre of Barcelona (CCIB). It includes Catalonia's largest shopping center Centre Comercial Diagonal Mar, as well as Parc de Diagonal Mar, designed by Enric Miralles and Benedetta Tagliabue.

== Beaches ==
Beaches in Diagonal Mar are family oriented and quieter than downtown beaches. The two beaches located in Diagonal Mar are La Mar Bella and La Nova Mar Bella.

== See also ==
Other major business districts of Barcelona:

- Gran Via
- 22@
