= Edificio Allianz, Barcelona =

Coordinates: 41.3767°N 2.1472°E

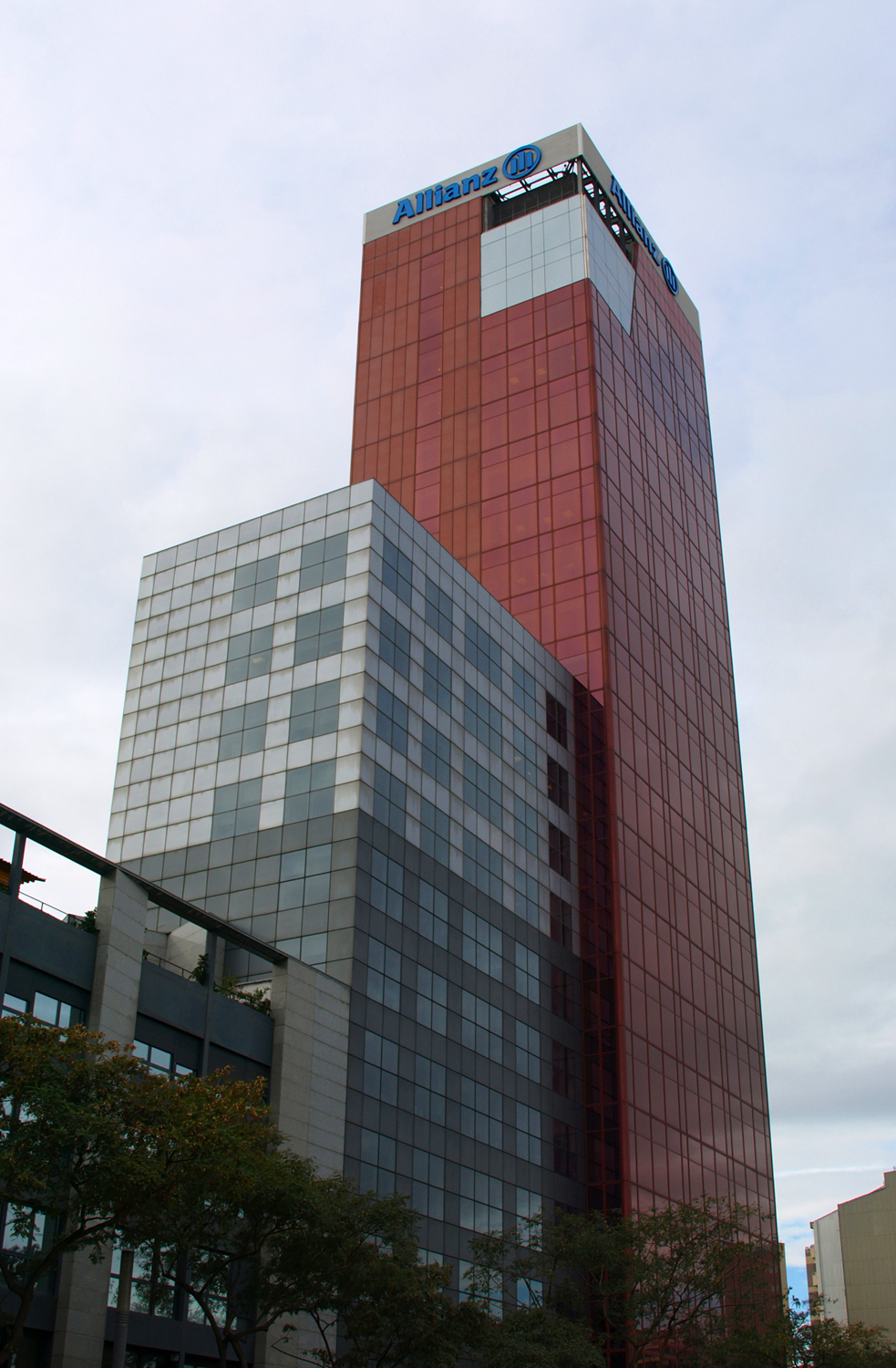
- Edificio Allianz
- Interactive map of the Edificio Allianz, Barcelona area

General information
- Status: Completed
- Type: office
- Location: Barcelona, Catalonia, Spain
- Completed: 1993

Height
- Height: 77 m (253 ft)

Technical details
- Floor count: 20

Edificio Allianz (Torre Allianz) is an office high-rise building in Barcelona, Catalonia, Spain. Completed in 1993, it has 20 floors and rises 77 meters. It is the 41st tallest building in Barcelona. The building belongs to the Allianz Company. It is located on Carrer de Tarragona street 103, near Plaça d'Espanya and three other skyscrapers: Edificio Tarragona, Hotel Torre Catalunya, and Torre Núñez y Navarro.

== See also ==
- List of tallest buildings and structures in Barcelona
