= Torre Banc de Sabadell =

Coordinates: 41.3950°N 2.1554°E

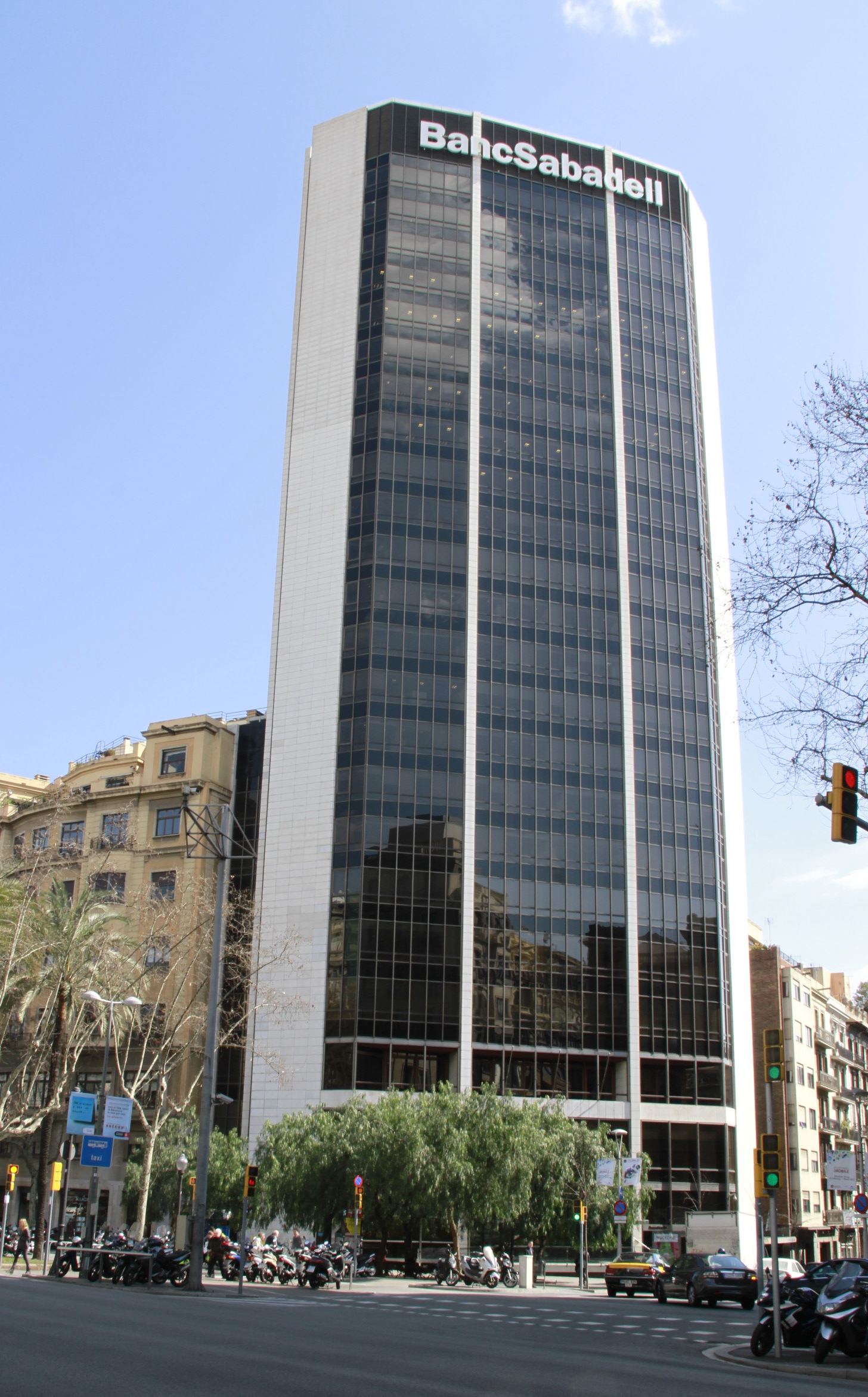
- Interactive map of the Torre Banc de Sabadell area

General information
- Status: Completed
- Type: office
- Location: Barcelona, Catalonia, Spain
- Construction started: 1965
- Completed: 1969

Height
- Height: 83 m (272 ft)

Technical details
- Floor count: 23

Torre Banc de Sabadell (also known as BancSabadell) is an office skyscraper in Barcelona, Catalonia, Spain. Built between 1965 and 1969, it has 23 floors and rises 83 meters.

It was designed by architects Santiago Balcells and Francesc Mitjans and was inspired by the Pirelli Tower in Milan. After its inauguration, it was shortly the tallest building in the city, until the completion of the Edificio Colón the following year.

== See also ==
- List of tallest buildings and structures in Barcelona
