= Diagonal ZeroZero =

Skyscraper in Barcelona

Coordinates: 41.4120°N 2.2203°E

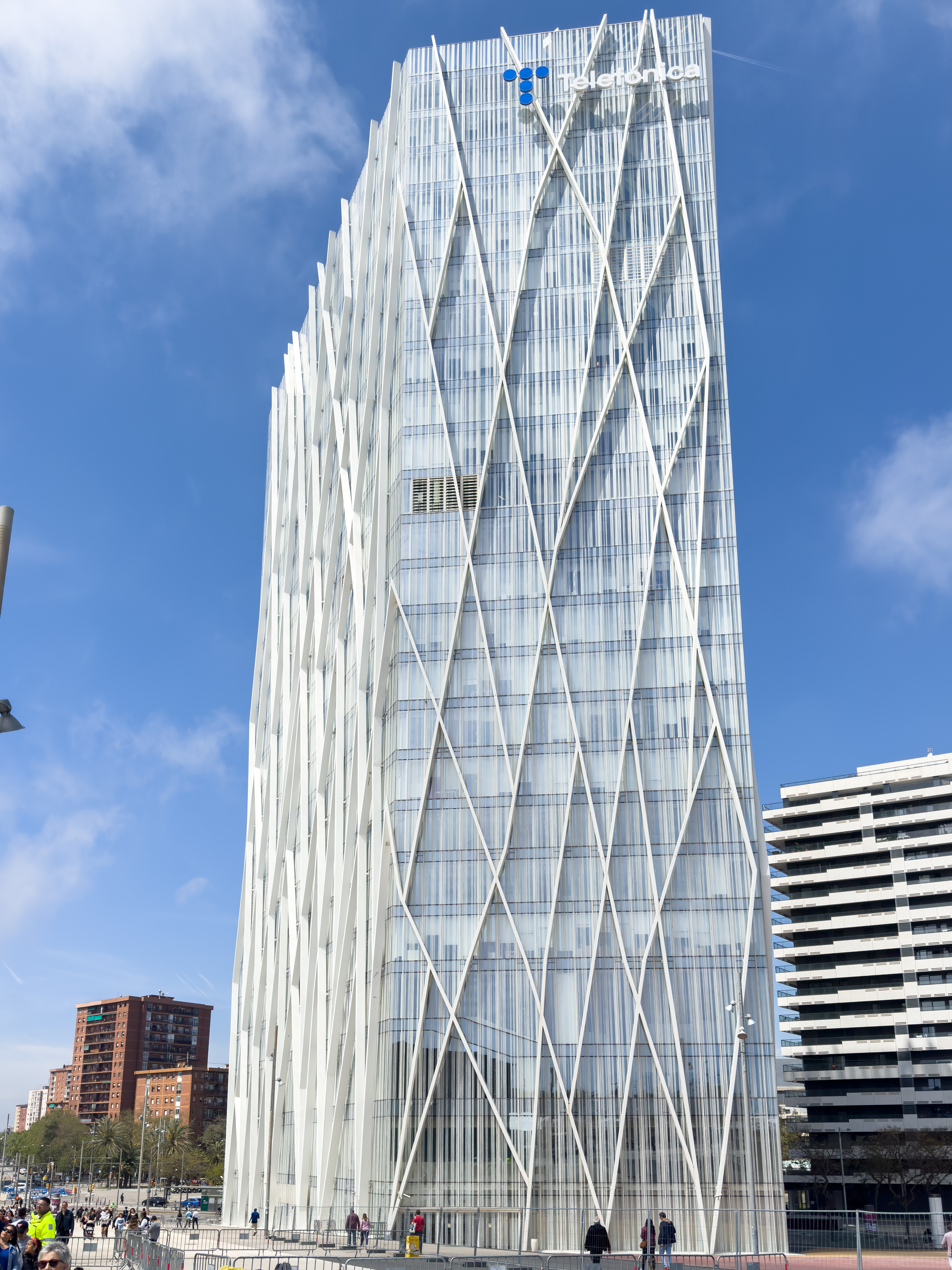

General information
- Status: Completed
- Type: Office
- Architectural style: Structural expressionism
- Location: Barcelona, Catalonia, Spain
- Construction started: April 2008
- Completed: February 2011
- Owner: Emperador Properties

Height
- Height: 110 m (361 ft)

Technical details
- Floor count: 25 (+2 below-grade)
- Floor area: 29,545 m^{2} (318,020 sq ft)
- Lifts/elevators: 6

Design and construction
- Architect: Enric Massip-Bosch

Diagonal ZeroZero (also Torre Diagonal ZeroZero, Diagonal 00) is a skyscraper in Barcelona, Catalonia, Spain. The building is 110 metres (360 ft) tall with 25 floors. It was designed by EMBA_Estudi Massip-Bosch Architects, founded and led by Enric Massip-Bosch.

Diagonal ZeroZero hosts the corporate headquarters in Catalonia of Telefónica Group, as well as its Research and Development Center. The building is built on land owned by the City of Barcelona, was developed by the public agency Consorci de la Zona Franca, and leased to Telefónica Group. In 2019, ownership of the building passed to Emperador Properties, owned by Filipino businessman Andrew Tan and owner of the Torres Emperador and Caleido in Madrid.

Diagonal Zero Zero is an example of high-tech architecture. Its structure, designed by EMBA and calculated by the engineering firm MC2-Julio Martínez Calzón, was erected in eight months, working in three shifts a day, seven days a week. For a few months there were over 450 workers operating simultaneously on-site. The total construction time, after an initial phase in which works were stopped for few months, amounted to two years until inauguration.

The structure of the building is a variation of the tube-in-tube scheme, in which the core (or inner 'tube') is built in concrete, and the perimeter structure (or outer 'tube') is built in steel. This perimeter structure is split in two rings: an interior vertical structure of very slender H pillars (10x10cm in the upper half of the tower, 14x14 cm in the lower half, under the 13th floor hosting the technical floor), placed every 135 cm; and an exterior bracing lattice supporting the torsion and flexing stresses of the tower produced by wind or earthquakes.

== Gallery ==
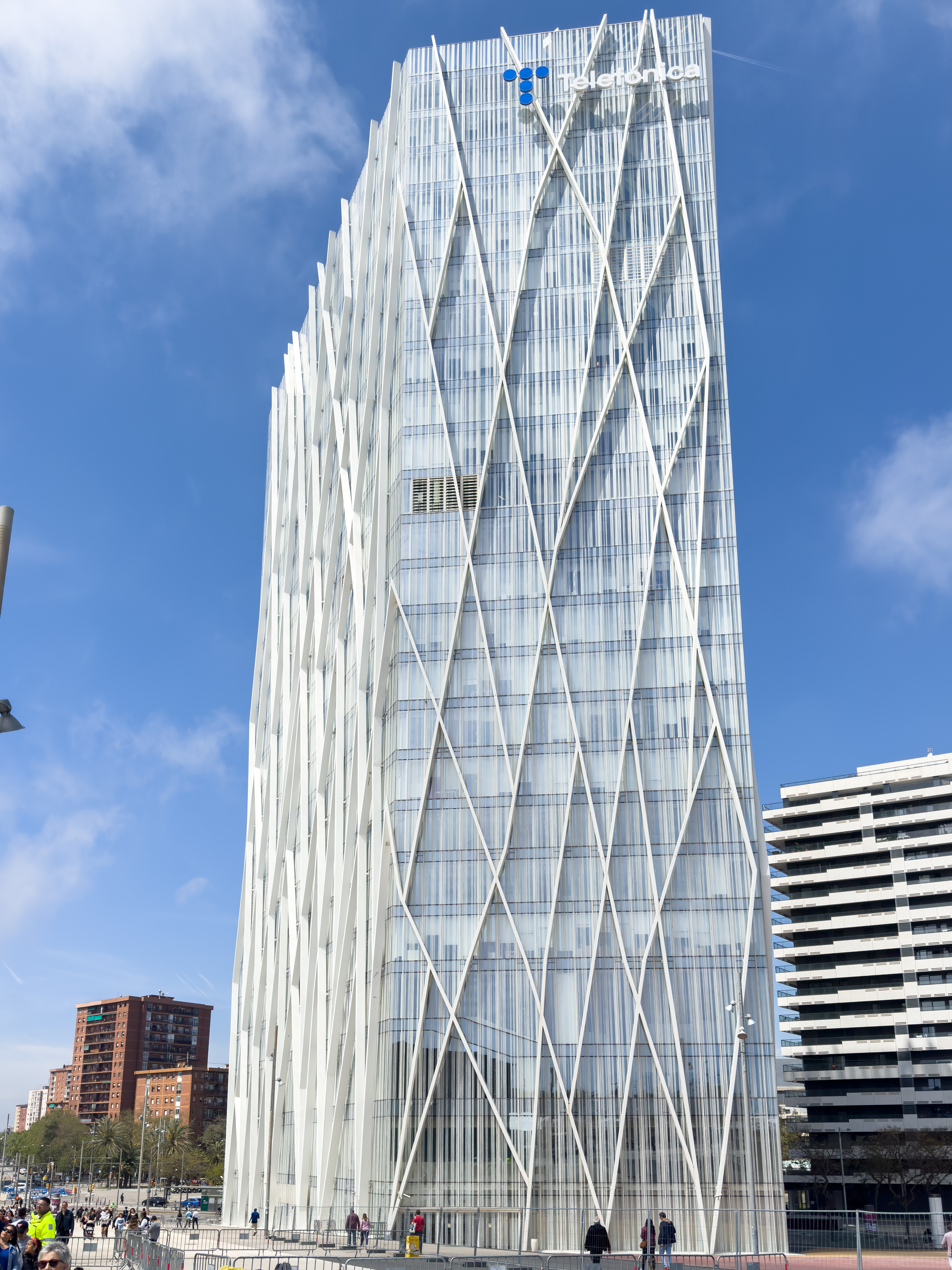

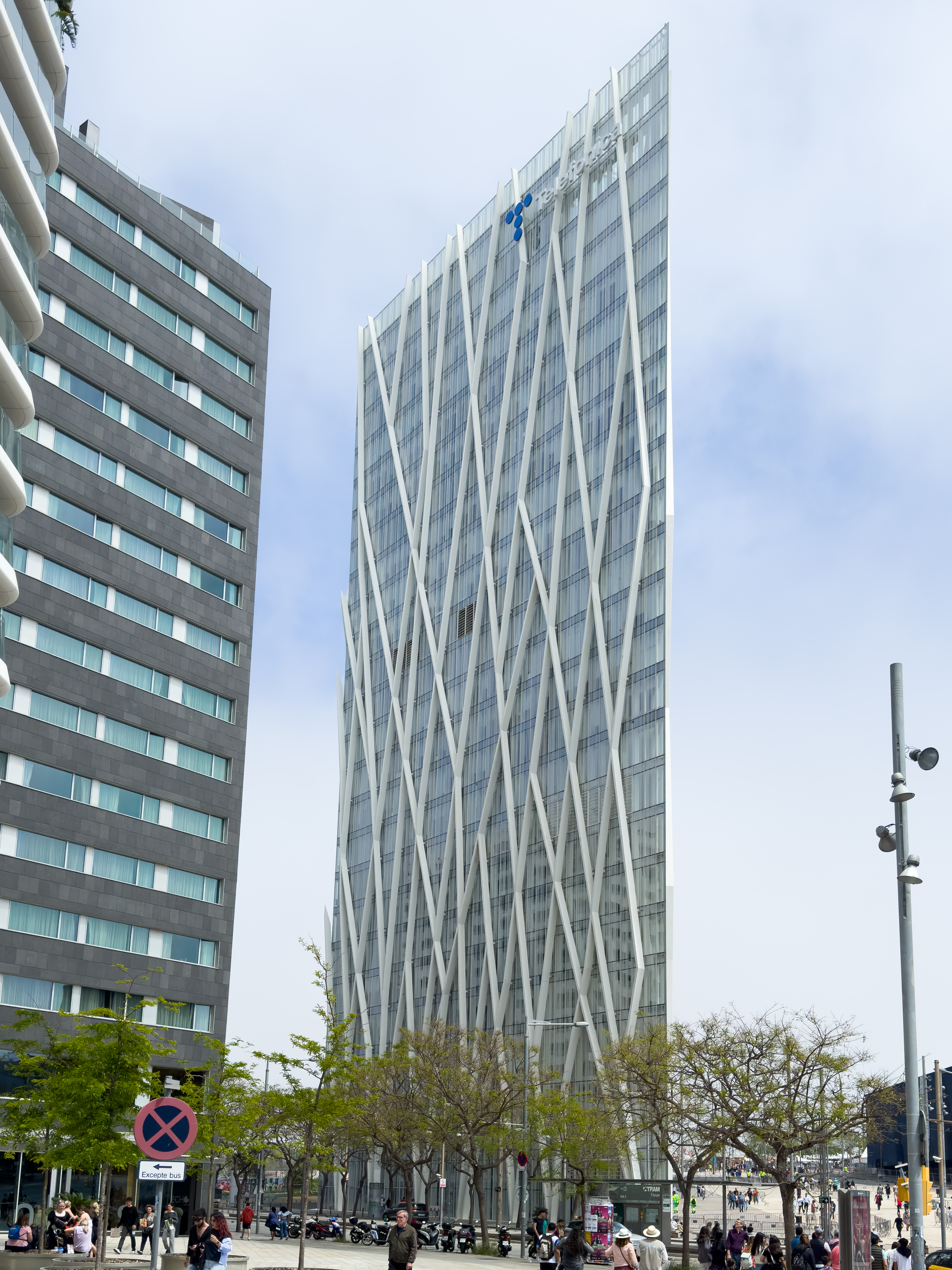

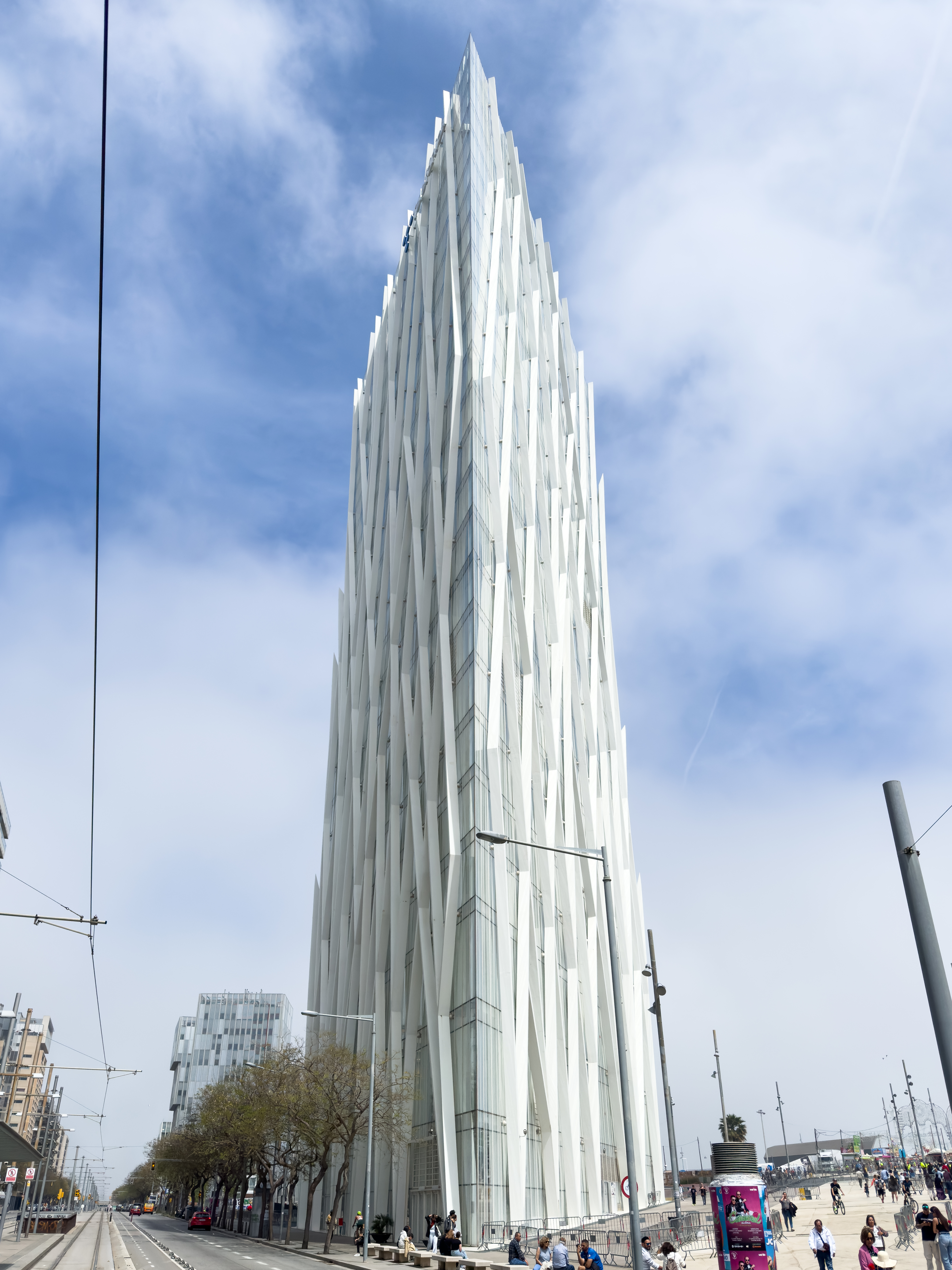

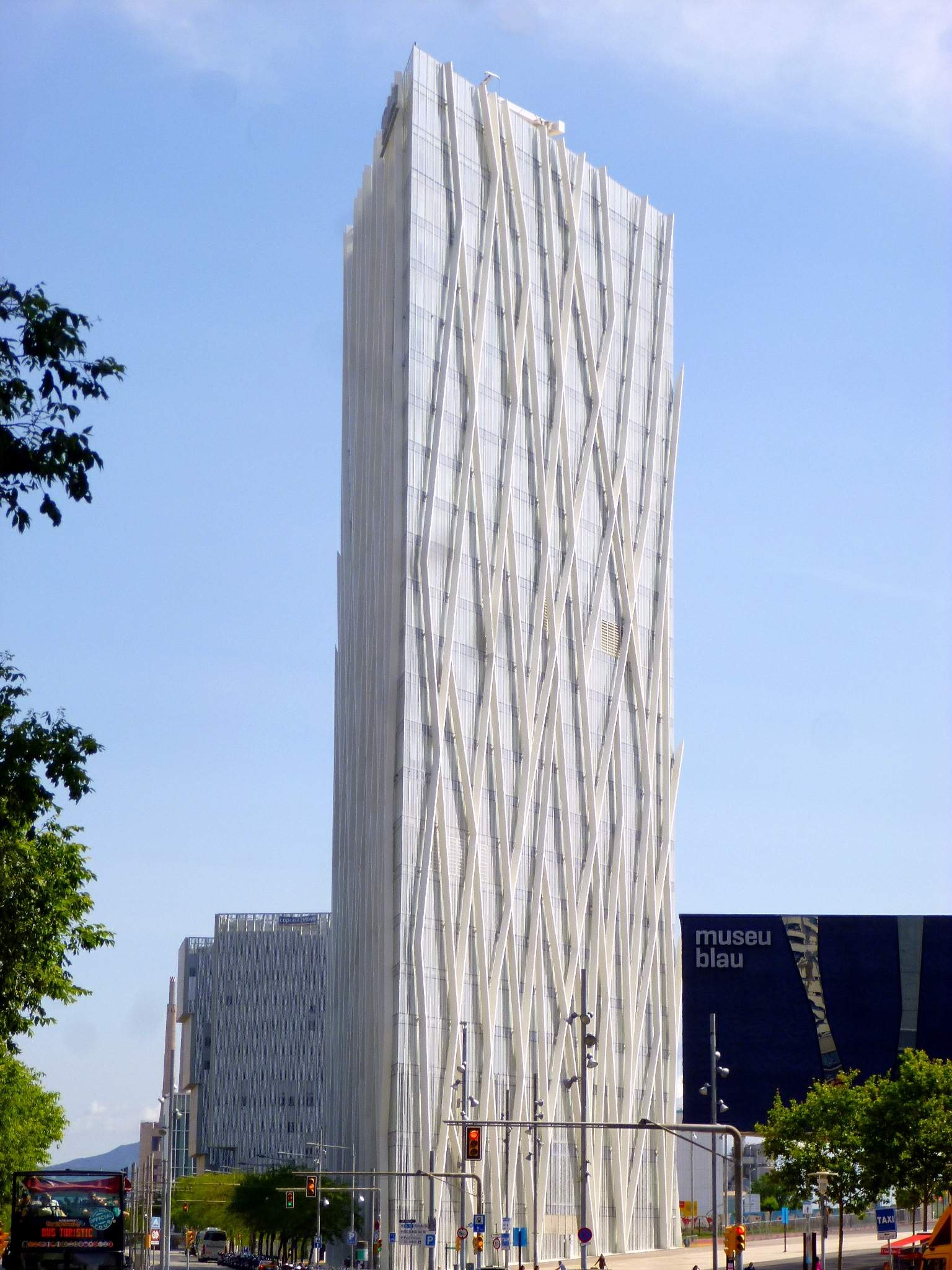

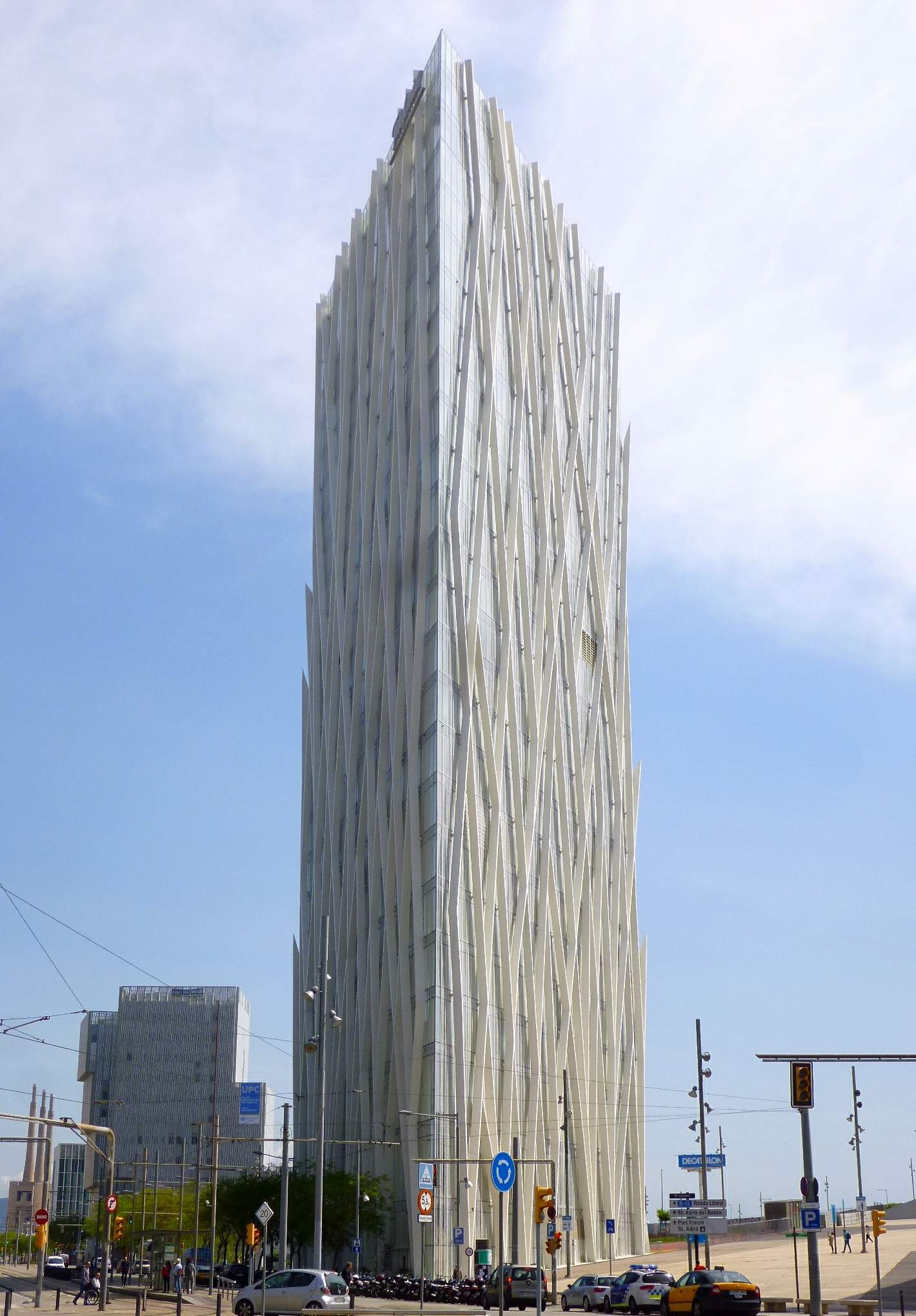

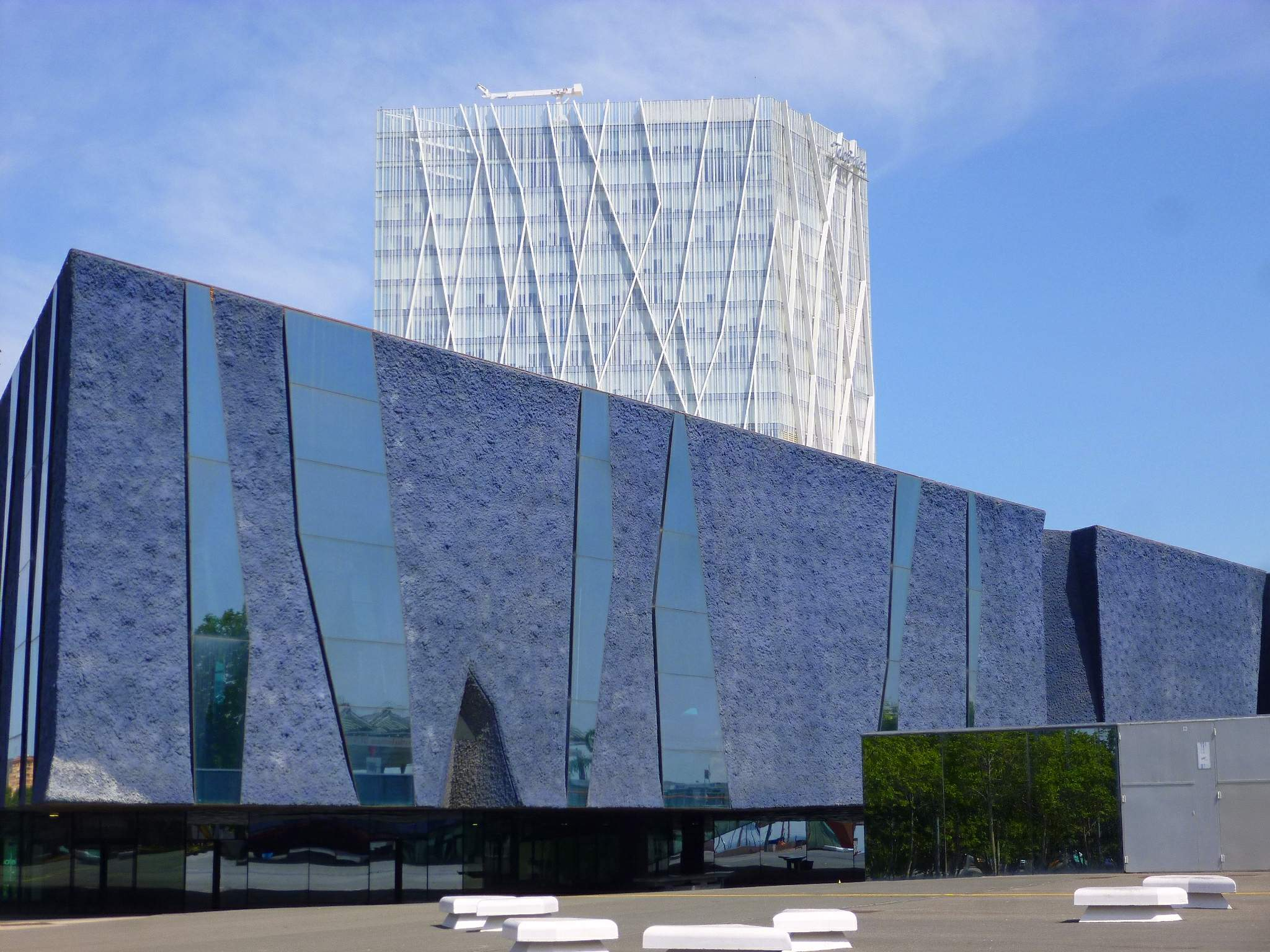

== See also ==
- List of tallest buildings and structures in Barcelona
