= List of tallest buildings in Barcelona =

Skyline of Barcelona
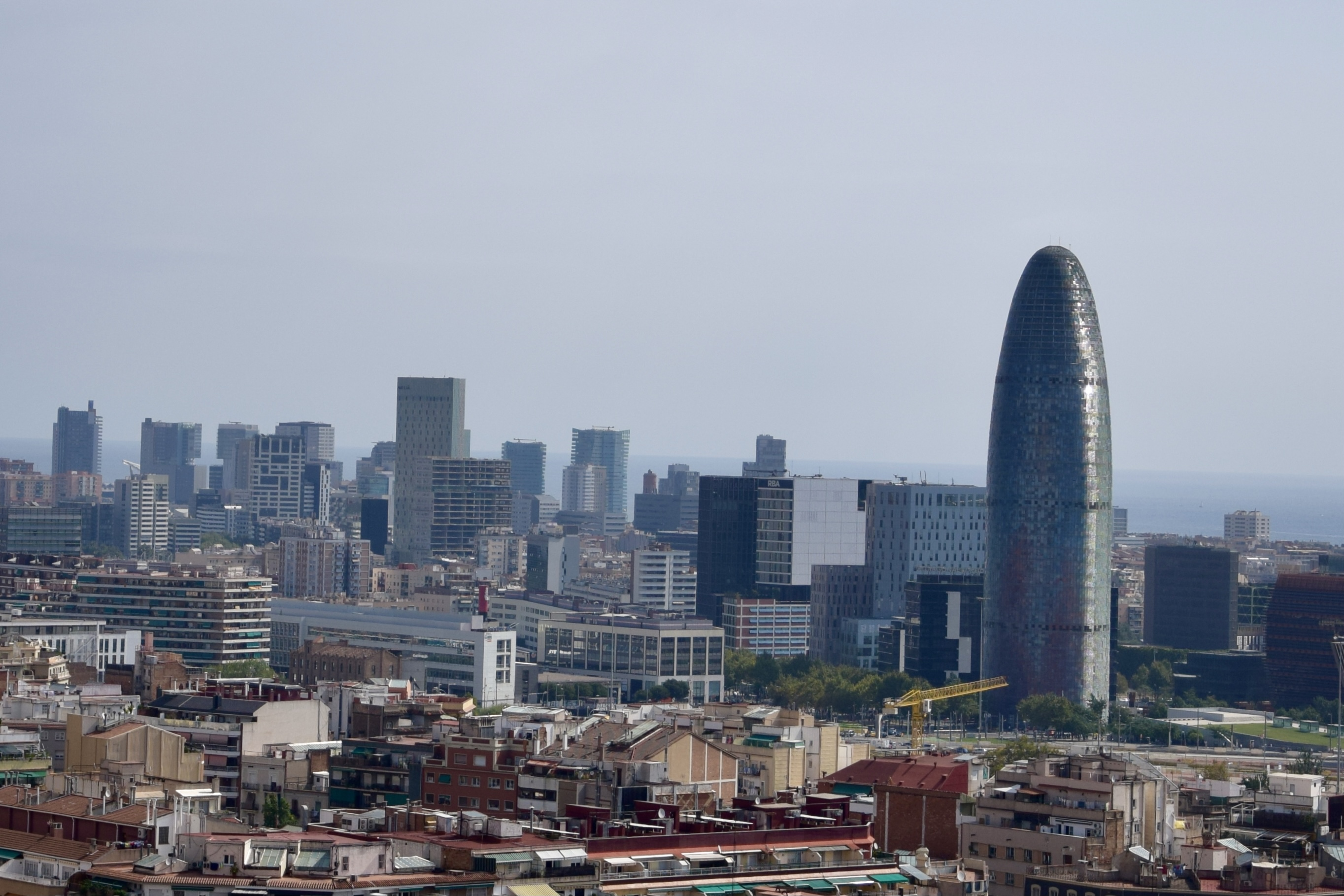
- The 22@ area in 2014, featuring the Torre Glòries, with the Diagonal Mar neighbourhood in the distance
- Cities included: Barcelona, L'Hospitalet de Llobregat, See list
- Tallest building: Hotel Arts (1992); Torre Mapfre (1992)
- Tallest building height: 154 m (505 ft)
- Major clusters: Diagonal Mar; 22@ Gran Via

Number of tall buildings (2026)
- Taller than 75 m (246 ft): 42
- Taller than 100 m (328 ft): 15
- Taller than 150 m (492 ft): 2

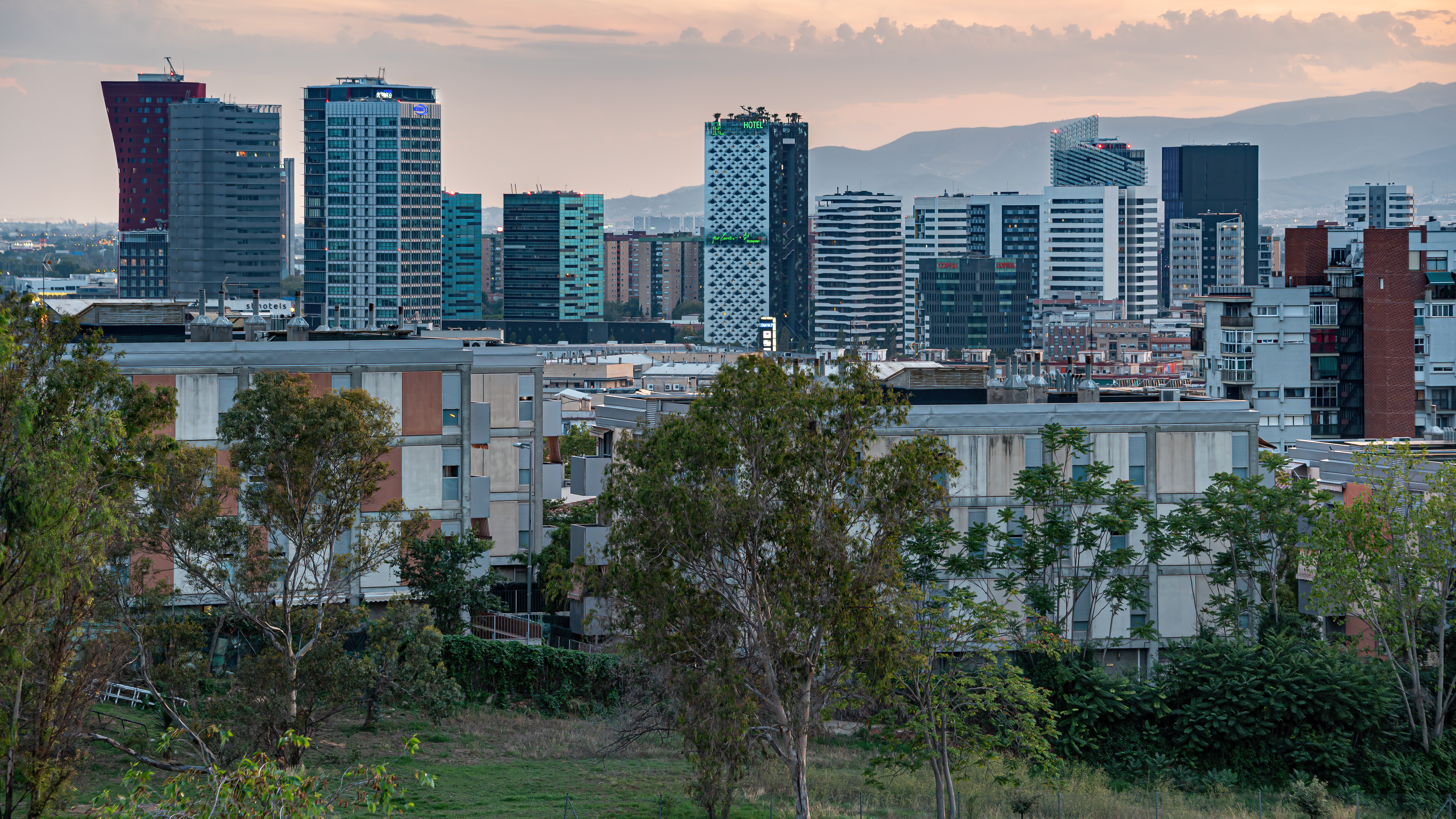
The Gran Via business district, seen in L'Hospitalet de Llobregat in 2023

Barcelona is the capital of Catalonia, the second biggest city in Spain, and the sixth-most populous urban area in the European Union. Barcelona and its metropolitan area is home to over 42 high-rise buildings taller than 75 m (246 ft), 15 of which rise taller than 100 m (328 ft) as of 2026. Barcelona's two tallest skyscrapers, the Hotel Arts and the Torre Mapfre, are tied in height at 154 m (505 ft). Both completed in 1992, the buildings are located in the seafront Port Olímpic area and situated next to each other. Barcelona's most notable tall structure, however, is the Sagrada Família, the tallest church in the world at a height of 172.5 m (566 ft).

The first high-rise in Barcelona was the Edificio Fàbregas, which boasted a height of 18 stories. Designed by Spanish architect Luis Gutiérrez Soto, construction began in 1936, but the outbreak of the Spanish Civil War delayed its completion until 1944. The Edificio Fàbregas became an architectural icon of post-war Barcelona, drawing inspiration from machine-age aesthetics and Art Deco. Shortly after, the 17-story Edificio Generali was completed in 1949 to serve as the headquarters for Banco Vitalicio. Its style was influenced by the Chicago School. Between 1957 to 1973, during the mayoralty of Josep Maria de Porcioles i Colomer, Barcelona was the site of rapid urban development, resulting in a surge of apartment construction and the addition of extra stories (remontas) to historical buildings in the Eixample district. The Edificio Colón, the first building to exceed 100 m (328 ft) in height, was completed in 1970.

A wave of high-rise development began in 1990s, concurring with Barcelona's Olympic Games in 1992. The construction of the Hotel Arts and Torre Mapfre that year was complemented by El Peix d'Or (Golden Fish), a sculpture by Frank Gehry. The 2000s saw another high-rise boom, spurred on by the 2004 Universal Forum of Cultures in the city. That year saw the completion of the 144 m (474 ft) tall Torre Agbar, now known as the Torre Glòries. Designed by French architect Jean Nouvel, its unusual shape and colourful glass façade have made it one of the city's modern icons. High-rises grew in the Diagonal Mar area and in 22@, a business centre launched in 2000 under the mayoralty of Joan Clos. The Great Recession brought an end to the boom, and high-rise construction waned in the 2010s.

L'Hospitalet de Llobregat, a municipality in Barcelona's metropolitan area, also underwent a high-rise boom in the 2000s. L'Hospitalet de Llobregat is home to seven buildings taller than 100 m (328 ft), nearly half of the metropolitan area's fifteen. The tallest building in the municipality is the Hotel Porta Fira, noted for its red exterior and irregular shape. While most of the municipality's high-rises are located in the Plaça d'Europa, being part of the Gran Via district, its history of tall buildings dates back to 1930s with the "Collblanc skyscraper", a 12-story functionalist-style building that was the tallest residential building in Spain at the time.

== History ==
Number of buildings by height in Barcelona and its metropolitan area by the end of each year, based on the information in this article. Click on the legend to toggle a specific height on or off. View chart definition.

== Cityscape ==
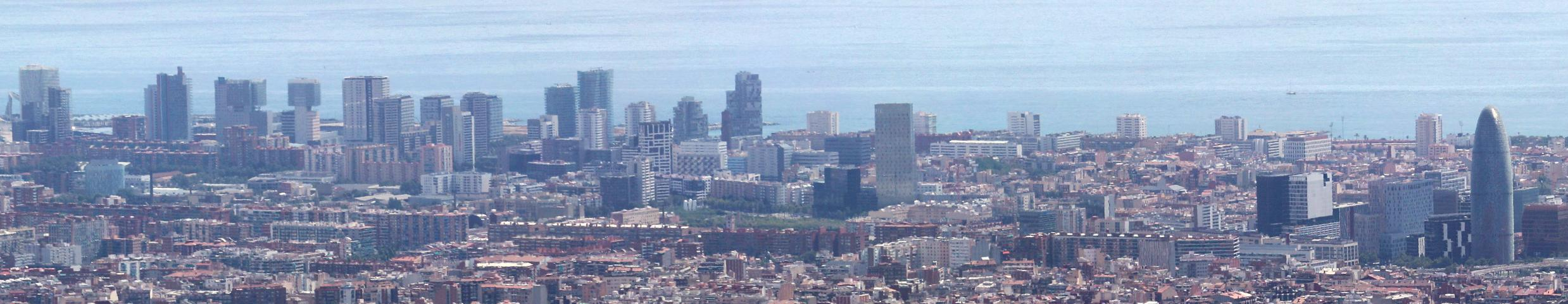
22@ business center in Diagonal Mar district, main cluster of skyscrapers in Barcelona.

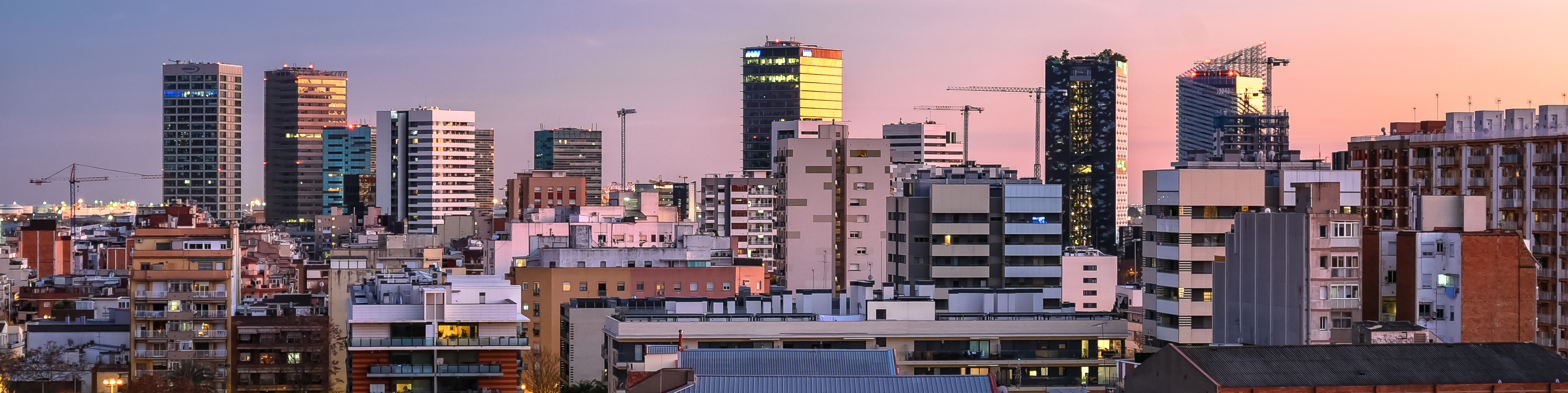
Gran Via business center in L'Hospitalet de Llobregat in 2019

== Map of tallest buildings ==
The map below shows the location of buildings taller than 75 m (246 ft) in Barcelona and its metropolitan area. Each marker is numbered by the building's height rank, and colored by the decade of its completion.

Buildings taller than 75 m (246 ft) in Barcelona and its metropolitan area. An asterisk (*) next to the building's name indicates it is located outside the map.
- 1950s and before
- 1960s
- 1970s
- 1980s
- 1990s
- 2000s
- 2010s
- 2020s
1 Hotel Arts
2 Torre Mapfre
3 Torre Glòries
4 Hotel Melia Barcelona Sky
5 Hotel Porta Fira
6 Torre Realia BCN
7 Edificio Colón
8 Diagonal ZeroZero
9 Hotel Princess
10 Torre Puig
11 Hyatt Regency Barcelona Tower
12 Renaissance Barcelona Fira Hotel
13 Torre Inbisa
14 Torre Werfen
15 Torre Diagonal
16 W Barcelona
17 Antares
18 Hotel AC Barcelona
19 Torre Llevant
20 Torre Ponent
21 Torre Millenium*
22 Illa del Mar 1
23 Torre Barceló*
24 Illa de la Llum 1
25 Consorci de la Zona Franca
26 Gas Natural Building
27 Torre Nova Diagonal
28 Puig Brands Torre 2
29 La Caixa 1
30 Hilton Diagonal Mar Barcelona Hotel
31 Torre Banc de Sabadell
32 Edificio Allianz
33 Nobu Hotel Barcelona
34 Porta Firal Audition
35 Torre Godó
36 Edificio Tarragona
37 Cubics I*
38 Grand Hyatt Barcelona
39 Melia Barcelona Hotel
40 Torre Núñez y Navarro
41 Illa del Mar 2
42 Bellvitge University Hospital

== Tallest buildings ==
This list ranks completed buildings in Barcelona that stand at least 75 m (246 ft) tall as of 2026, based on standard height measurement. This includes spires and architectural details but does not include antenna masts. The “Year” column indicates the year of completion. Buildings tied in height are sorted by year of completion with earlier buildings ranked first, and then alphabetically.

Was the tallest building in Barcelona upon completion

| Rank | Name | Image | Location | Height m (ft) | Floors | Year | Purpose | Notes |
|---|---|---|---|---|---|---|---|---|
| N/A | Torre de Collserola | | Barcelona; Sarrià-Sant Gervasi; 41°25′02″N 2°06′51″E | 288.4 (946) | N/A | 1991 | Communication; Observation | Designed by Norman Foster and by Spanish civil engineers Julio Martínez Calzón and Manuel Julià Vilardell, the tower was built for the 1992 Summer Olympics in Barcelona. Tallest structure in Barcelona. |
| N/A | Sagrada Família | | Barcelona; Eixample; 41°24′13″N 2°10′28″E | 172.5 (566) | 1 | 2034 | Religious | The Sagrada Família is a Catholic church designed by Antoni Gaudí and one of the city's most famous landmarks. It is the tallest church in the world. Construction on the church has been ongoing since 1882 and is expected to be completed in the 2030s. |
| 1 | Hotel Arts | | Barcelona; Ciutat Vella; 41°23′13″N 2°11′46″E | 154 (505) | 44 | 1992 | Hotel | Joint-tallest building in Barcelona since 1992. Tallest hotel building in Barcelona. Joint-tallest building completed in Barcelona in the 1990s. |
| 2 | Torre Mapfre | | Barcelona; Ciutat Vella; 41°23′16″N 2°11′51″E | 154 (505) | 40 | 1992 | Office | Joint-tallest building in Barcelona since 1992. Tallest office building in Barcelona. Joint-tallest building completed in Barcelona in the 1990s |
| 3 | Torre Glòries | | Barcelona; Sant Martí; 41°24′13″N 2°11′22″E | 144.4 (474) | 35 | 2004 | Office | Formerly known as the Torre Agbar. Tallest building completed in Barcelona in the 2000s. |
| N/A | Montjuïc Communications Tower | | Barcelona; Sants-Montjuïc; 41°21′51″N 2°09′02″E | 136 (446) | N/A | 1992 | Communication | |
| 4 | Hotel Melia Barcelona Sky | | Barcelona; Sant Martí; 41°24′23″N 2°12′02″E | 115.2 (378) | 31 | 2008 | Hotel | Also known as Habitat Sky and Sky Barcelona. |
| 5 | Hotel Porta Fira | | L'Hospitalet; Granvia l'Hospitalet; 41°21′18″N 2°07′31″E | 113.6 (373) | 27 | 2010 | Hotel | Tallest building in L'Hospitalet de Llobregat. |
| 6 | Torre Realia BCN | | L'Hospitalet; Granvia l'Hospitalet; 41°21′20″N 2°07′30″E | 113.3 (372) | 24 | 2009 | Office | Tallest building in L'Hospitalet de Llobregat briefly from 2009 to 2010. |
| 7 | Edificio Colón | | Barcelona; Ciutat Vella; 41°22′35″N 2°10′31″E | 110 (361) | 28 | 1970 | Office | Tallest building in Barcelona from 1970 to 1992. Tallest building completed in Barcelona in the 1970s. |
| 8 | Diagonal ZeroZero | | Barcelona; Sant Martí; 41°24′44″N 2°13′14″E | 110 (361) | 24 | 2011 | Office | Tallest building completed in Barcelona in the 2010s. |
| 9 | Hotel Princess | | Barcelona; Sant Martí; 41°24′39″N 2°13′07″E | 109 (358) | 26 | 2004 | Hotel | |
| 10 | Torre Puig | | L'Hospitalet; Bellvitge; 41°21′27″N 2°07′20″E | 109 (358) | 22 | 2013 | Hotel | Headquarters of Spanish fashion company Puig. |
| N/A | Torre Jaume I | | Barcelona; Ciutat Vella; 41°22′23″N 2°11′16″E | 107 (351) | N/A | 1931 | Observation | |
| 11 | Hyatt Regency Barcelona Tower | | L'Hospitalet; Bellvitge; 41°20′46″N 2°06′31″E | 105 (344) | 28 | 2006 | Hotel | Tallest building in L'Hospitalet de Llobregat from 2006 to 2009. The hotel opened as the Hesperia Tower. It was renamed NH Collection Barcelona Tower in 2016, and again renamed Hesperia Barcelona Tower Hotel in 2019. It was later renamed Hyatt Regency Barcelona Tower in 2020. |
| 12 | Renaissance Barcelona Fira Hotel | | L'Hospitalet; Granvia l'Hospitalet; 41°21′23″N 2°07′23″E | 105 (344) | 26 | 2012 | Hotel | Formerly known as the Hotel Catalonia Plaza Europa and Hotel Catalonia Fira. |
| 13 | Torre Inbisa | | L'Hospitalet; Granvia l'Hospitalet; 41°21′26″N 2°07′40″E | 103.9 (341) | 25 | 2008 | Office | Also known as Torre Europa 1. |
| 14 | Torre Werfen | | L'Hospitalet; Granvia l'Hospitalet; 41°21′24″N 2°07′39″E | 103.9 (341) | 25 | 2009 | Office | Also known as Torre Zenit, Torre Banif, and Torre Europa 2. |
| 15 | Torre Diagonal | | Barcelona; Sant Martí; 41°24′22″N 2°11′59″E | 103.6 (340) | 27 | 2016 | Residential | Also known as Diagonal-Bilbao-Pere IV. |
| 16 | W Barcelona | | Barcelona; Ciutat Vella; 41°22′06″N 2°11′25″E | 98.8 (324) | 29 | 2009 | Hotel | Also known as the Hotel Vela (Sail Hotel) due to its shape. |
| 17 | Antares | | Barcelona; Sant Martí; 41°24′43″N 2°13′09″E | 96 (315) | 27 | 2022 | Residential | Tallest building completed in Barcelona in the 2020s. |
| 18 | Hotel AC Barcelona | | Barcelona; Sant Martí; 41°24′36″N 2°13′07″E | 93.9 (308) | 22 | 2004 | Hotel | |
| 19 | Torre Llevant | | Barcelona; Sants-Montjuïc; 41°21′25″N 2°08′27″E | 91 (298) | 22 | 2021 | Office | Part of a complex of twin towers along with Torre Ponent, and part of BCN Fira District. |
| 20 | Torre Ponent | | Barcelona; Sants-Montjuïc; 41°21′26″N 2°08′25″E | 91 (298) | 22 | 2021 | Office | Part of a complex of twin towers along with Torre Llevant, and part of BCN Fira District. |
| 21 | Torre Millenium | | Sabadell; 41°33′19″N 2°05′53″E | 90 (295) | 22 | 2002 | Office | |
| 22 | Illa del Mar 1 | | Barcelona; Sant Martí; 41°24′23″N 2°13′01″E | 90 (295) | 27 | 2009 | Residential | |
| 23 | Torre Barceló | | Mataró; 41°31′56″N 2°26′33″E | 89 (292) | 26 | 2025 | Residential | Tallest building in Mataró. |
| 24 | Illa de la Llum 1 | | Barcelona; Sant Martí; 41°24′18″N 2°12′55″E | 88.3 (290) | 26 | 2005 | Residential | |
| 25 | Consorci de la Zona Franca | | Barcelona; Sant Martí; 41°24′34″N 2°13′05″E | 87.9 (288) | 22 | 2005 | Office | |
| 26 | Gas Natural Building | | Barcelona; Sant Martí; 41°23′01″N 2°11′25″E | 86 (282) | 20 | 2005 | Office | Known as Edifici Gas Natural in Catalan. Also known as Mare Nostrum Tower. Features two lower horizontal glazed blocks protruding and cantilevered out from the main tower. The structure was completed in 2005 and inaugurated in 2008. |
| 27 | Torre Nova Diagonal | | Barcelona; Sant Martí; 41°24′27″N 2°12′21″E | 86 (282) | 22 | 2007 | Residential | |
| 28 | Puig Brands Torre 2 | — | L'Hospitalet; Bellvitge; 41°21′29″N 2°07′22″E | 86 (282) | 21 | 2023 | Office | Also known as Torre Colonial. |
| 29 | La Caixa 1 | | Barcelona; Les Corts; 41°23′14″N 2°07′32″E | 85 (279) | 26 | 1974 | Office | |
| 30 | Hilton Diagonal Mar Barcelona Hotel | | Barcelona; Sant Martí; 41°24′32″N 2°13′03″E | 85 (279) | 25 | 2004 | Hotel | |
| 31 | Torre Banc de Sabadell | | Barcelona; Eixample; 41°23′42″N 2°09′20″E | 83 (272) | 23 | 1969 | Office | Tallest building in Barcelona briefly from 1969 to 1970. Tallest building completed in Barcelona in the 1960s. Also known as Banco Atlantico. |
| 32 | Edificio Allianz | | Barcelona; Sants-Montjuïc; 41°22′36″N 2°08′49″E | 81 (266) | 20 | 1993 | Office | Also known as Torre Allianz. |
| 33 | Nobu Hotel Barcelona | | Barcelona; Sants-Montjuïc; 41°22′47″N 2°08′33″E | 80 (262) | 25 | 1970 | Hotel | Formerly known as Torre Catalunya and Gran Hotel Torre Catalunya. It was renamed the Nobu Hotel Barcelona in 2019, following a major renovation. |
| 34 | Porta Firal Audition | | Barcelona; Sants-Montjuïc; 41°21′24″N 2°08′21″E | 80 (262) | 25 | 2013 | Office | Also known as Porta Firal 1. |
| 35 | Torre Godó | | Barcelona; Eixample; 41°23′33″N 2°08′45″E | 78 (255) | 24 | 1970 | Office | Headquarters of media conglomerate Grupo Godó. |
| 36 | Edificio Tarragona | | Barcelona; Sants-Montjuïc; 41°22′44″N 2°08′39″E | 78 (256) | 22 | 1998 | Office | |
| 37 | Cubics I | | Santa Coloma; 41°27′24″N 2°12′20″E | 78 (256) | 25 | 2010 | Residential | Part of the Complex La Pallaresa development. |
| 38 | Grand Hyatt Barcelona | | Barcelona; Les Corts; 41°23′10″N 2°07′23″E | 77.4 (254) | 22 | 1975 | Hotel | Originally opened as the Hotel Princesa Sofia in 1975. It was renamed InterContinental Princesa Sofia in 1996, then Gran Hotel Princesa Sofia in 2004. It was completely renovated in 2017 and renamed Hotel SOFIA Barcelona. The hotel joined The Unbound Collection of Hyatt Hotels in 2018. It was renamed Grand Hyatt Barcelona in 2024. |
| 39 | Melia Barcelona Hotel | | Barcelona; Les Corts; 41°23′28″N 2°08′30″E | 77 (251) | 23 | 1972 | Hotel | |
| 40 | Torre Núñez y Navarro | | Barcelona; Sants-Montjuïc; 41°22′42″N 2°08′41″E | 77 (253) | 20 | 1993 | Office | |
| 41 | Illa del Mar 2 | | Barcelona; Sant Martí; 41°24′25″N 2°12′58″E | 76.8 (252) | 22 | 2008 | Residential | |
| 42 | Bellvitge University Hospital | | L'Hospitalet; Bellvitge; 41°20′41″N 2°06′15″E | 75 (246) | 22 | 1972 | Hospital | |

== Tallest under construction or proposed ==
=== Under construction ===
The following table includes buildings under construction in Barcelona and its metropolitan area that are planned to be at least 75 m (246 ft) tall as of 2026, based on standard height measurement. The “Year” column indicates the expected year of completion. Buildings that are on hold are not included.

| Name | Location | Height m (ft) | Floors | Year | Purpose | Notes |
|---|---|---|---|---|---|---|
| Porta Diagonal (Finestrelles) Office Building | Esplugues de Llobregat | 100 (328) | 23 | 2026 | Office | |
| Porta Diagonal (Finestrelles) Hotel Building | Esplugues de Llobregat | 100 (328) | 23 | 2026 | Hotel | |

=== Proposed ===
As of 2026, there are no approved or proposed buildings in Barcelona that are planned to be at least 75 m (246 ft) tall.

== See also ==
- List of tallest buildings in Benidorm
- List of tallest buildings in Madrid
