= Nobu Hotel Barcelona =

Skyscraper in Spain

Coordinates: 41.3797°N 2.1425°E

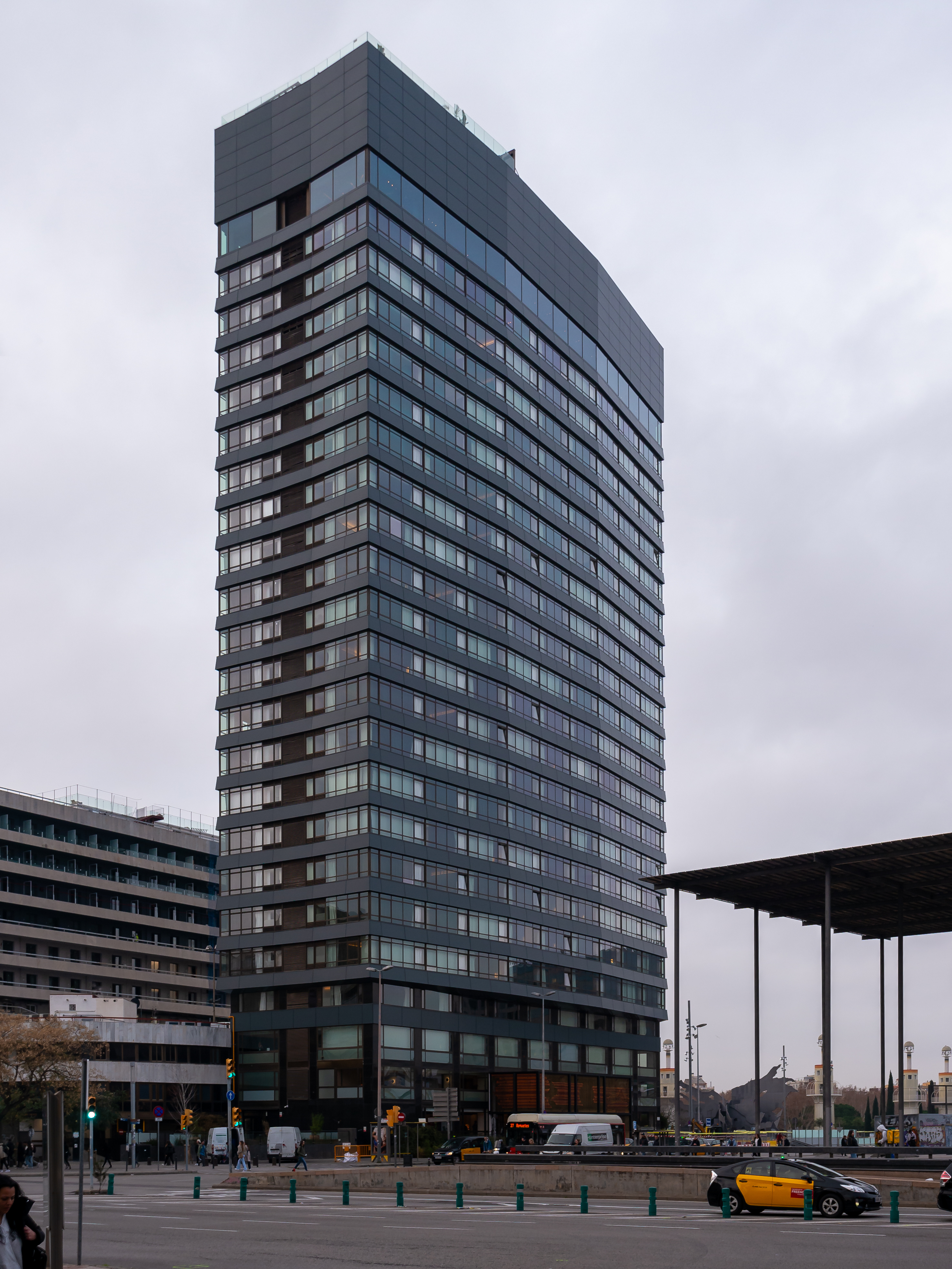
- Nobu Hotel Barcelona
- Interactive map of the Nobu Hotel Barcelona area

General information
- Status: Completed
- Type: hotel
- Location: Barcelona, Catalonia, Spain
- Completed: 1970

Height
- Height: 100 m (328 ft)

Technical details
- Floor count: 25

The Nobu Hotel Barcelona, formerly the Gran Hotel Torre Catalunya, is a skyscraper and hotel in Barcelona, Catalonia, Spain. Completed in 1970, has 25 floors and rises 100 metres (including mast) and 80 metres without mast. It is located near Barcelona Sants Railway Station, Plaça d'Espanya and three other high-rises: Edificio Allianz, Edificio Tarragona, Torre Núñez y Navarro. It was renamed Nobu Hotel Barcelona in 2019, following a major renovation.

== See also ==
- List of tallest buildings and structures in Barcelona
