= Edificio Tarragona =

Coordinates: 41.3787°N 2.1444°E

Edifici Tarragona
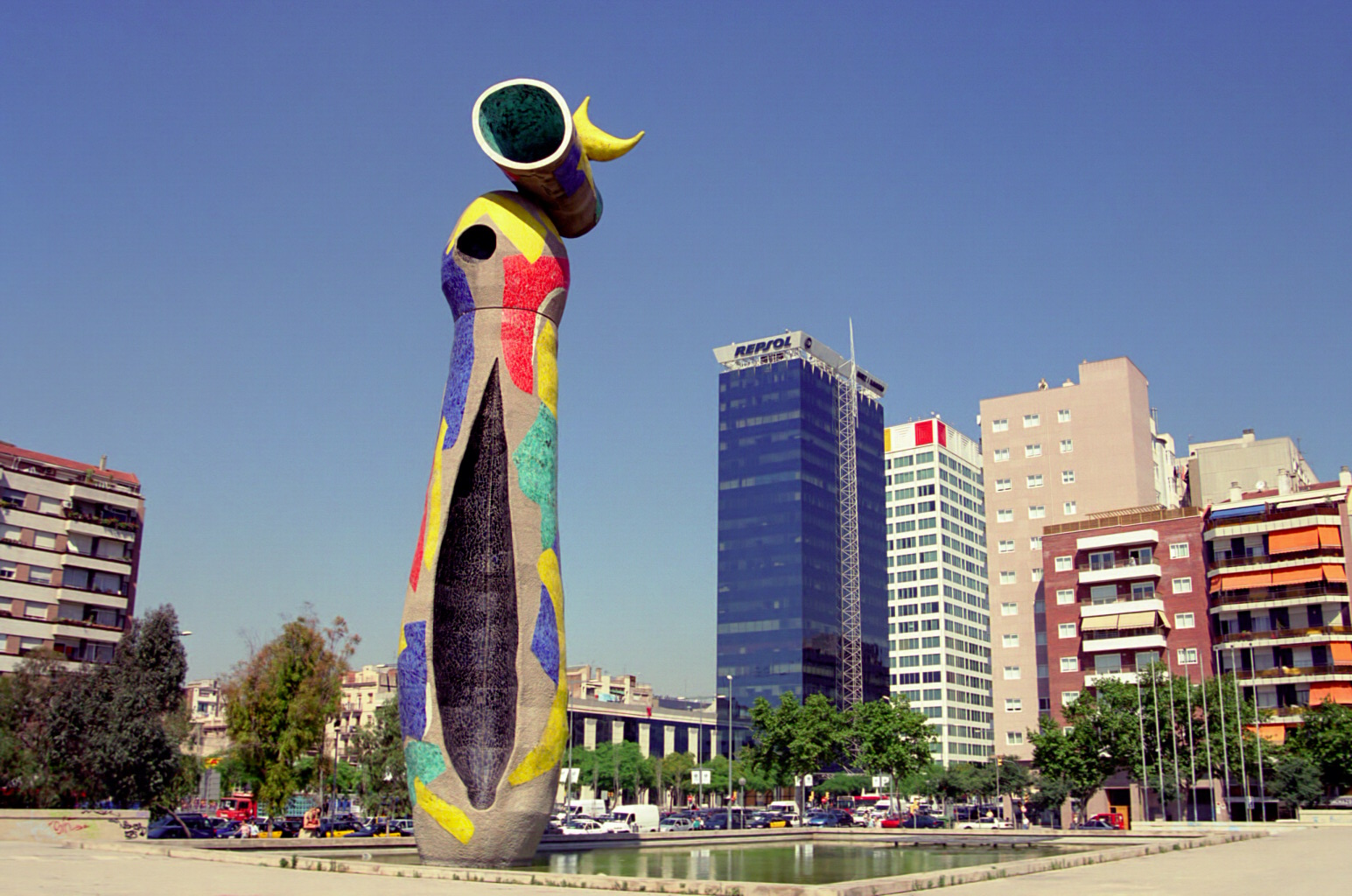
- Second high-rise(white colour)
- Interactive map of the Edifici Tarragona area

General information
- Status: Completed
- Type: office
- Location: Barcelona, Catalonia, Spain
- Construction started: 1994
- Completed: 1998

Height
- Height: 78 m (256 ft)

Technical details
- Floor count: 22

Edifici Tarragona is a high-rise building in Barcelona, Catalonia, Spain. Completed in 1998, has 22 floors and rises 78 metres. Lies on Carrer de Tarragona street 159, near Plaça d'Espanya and three other high-rises: Edificio Allianz, Hotel Torre Catalunya, Torre Núñez y Navarro.

== See also ==
- List of tallest buildings and structures in Barcelona
