= Torre Núñez y Navarro =

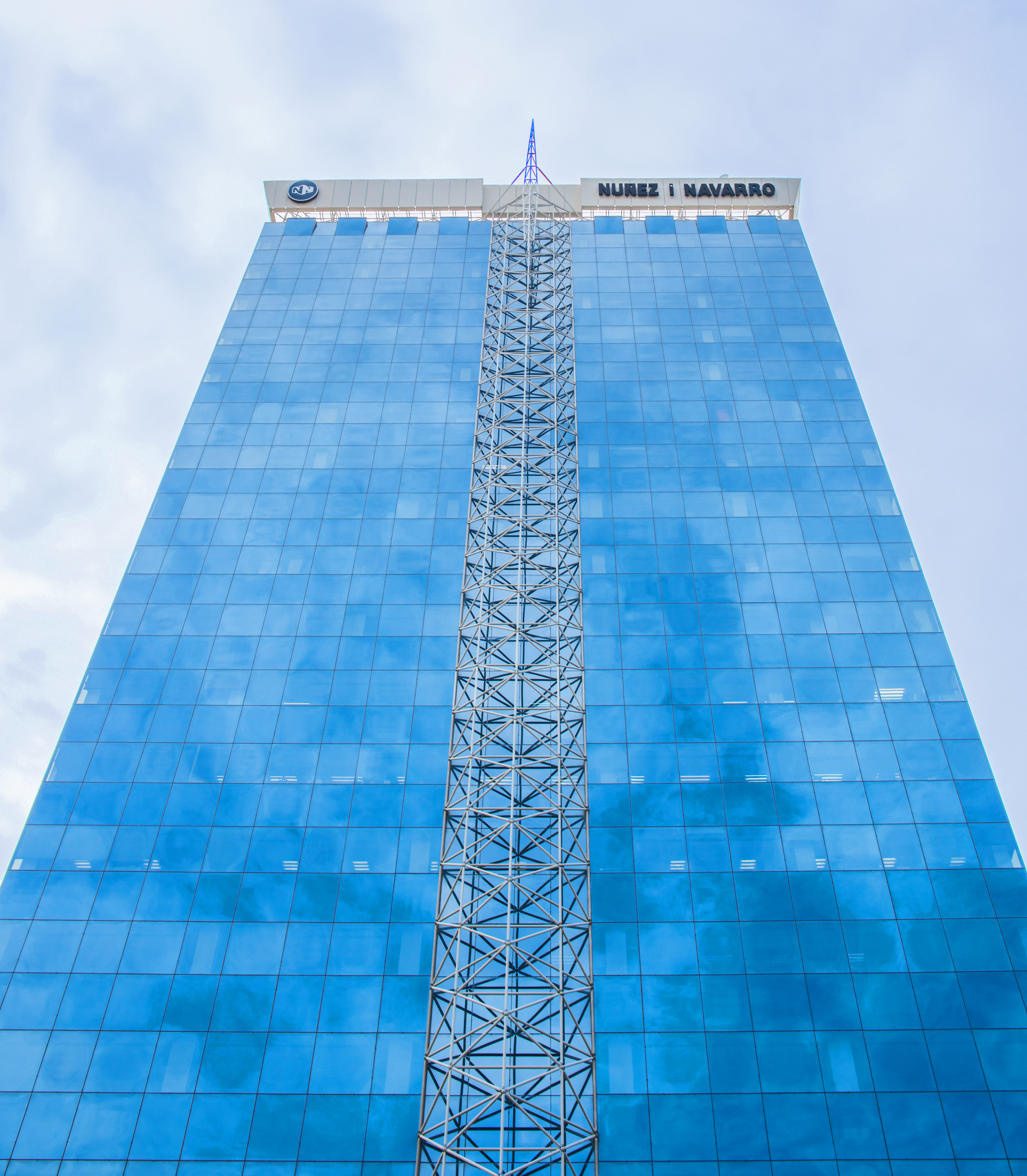
- Interactive map of the Torre Núñez y Navarro area

General information
- Status: Completed
- Type: office
- Location: Barcelona, Catalonia, Spain
- Completed: 1993

Height
- Height: 77 m (253 ft)

Technical details
- Floor count: 20

Torre Núñez y Navarro (also Repsol building) is a high-rise building in Barcelona, Catalonia, Spain. Completed in 1993, it has 20 floors and rises 77 meters. It lies on Carrer de Tarragona street 141, near Plaça d'Espanya and three other high-rises: Edificio Allianz, Hotel Torre Catalunya, Edificio Tarragona.

== See also ==
- List of tallest buildings and structures in Barcelona
