= Hilton Diagonal Mar Barcelona =

Coordinates: 41.4092°N 2.2175°E

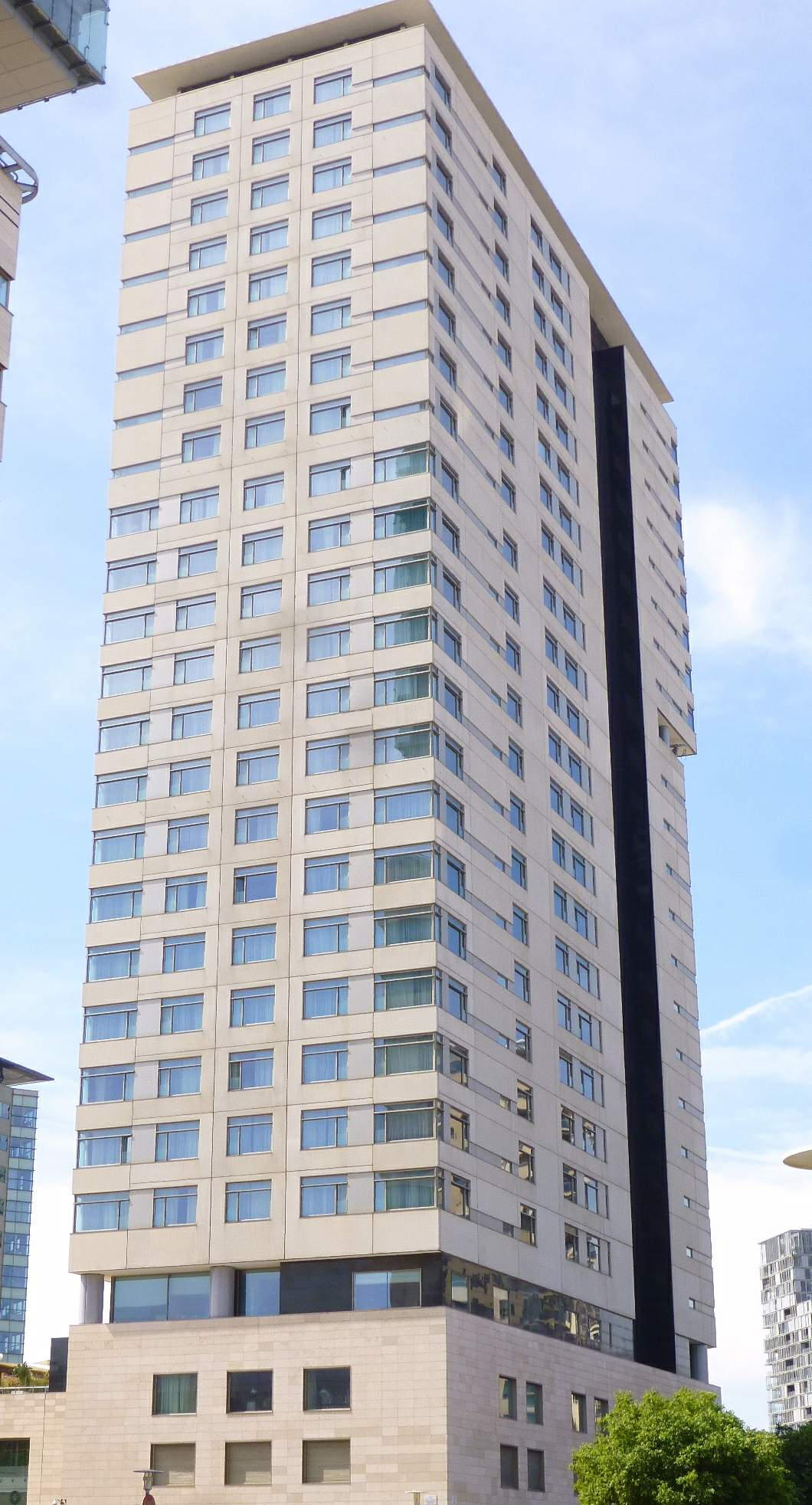
- Interactive map of the Hilton Diagonal Mar Barcelona area

General information
- Status: Completed
- Type: hotel
- Location: Barcelona, Catalonia, Spain, Passeig del Taulat street 262-264
- Construction started: 2001
- Completed: 2004

Height
- Height: 85 m (279 ft)

Technical details
- Floor count: 25

Website
- Official website

Hilton Diagonal Mar Barcelona is a skyscraper and hotel in Barcelona, Catalonia, Spain. Completed in 2004, has 25 floors and rises 85 metres. It is part of Hilton Hotels. Lies on Passeig del Taulat street 262–264.

In March 2019, the hotel completed an extensive 3-phase renovation program. The first phase was completed in 2017. This renovation covers the guest rooms in the building. The second renovation includes the refurbishment of meeting and event rooms and was completed in 2018. The last phase, which was completed in 2019, includes a lobby addition and a restaurant renovation on the first floor.

== See also ==
- List of tallest buildings and structures in Barcelona

== Curiosity ==
In Barcelona exists another Hilton Barcelona, built in 1990, on Avinguda Diagonal 589.
