= Torre Godó =

Building in Barcelona

Torre Grupo Godó
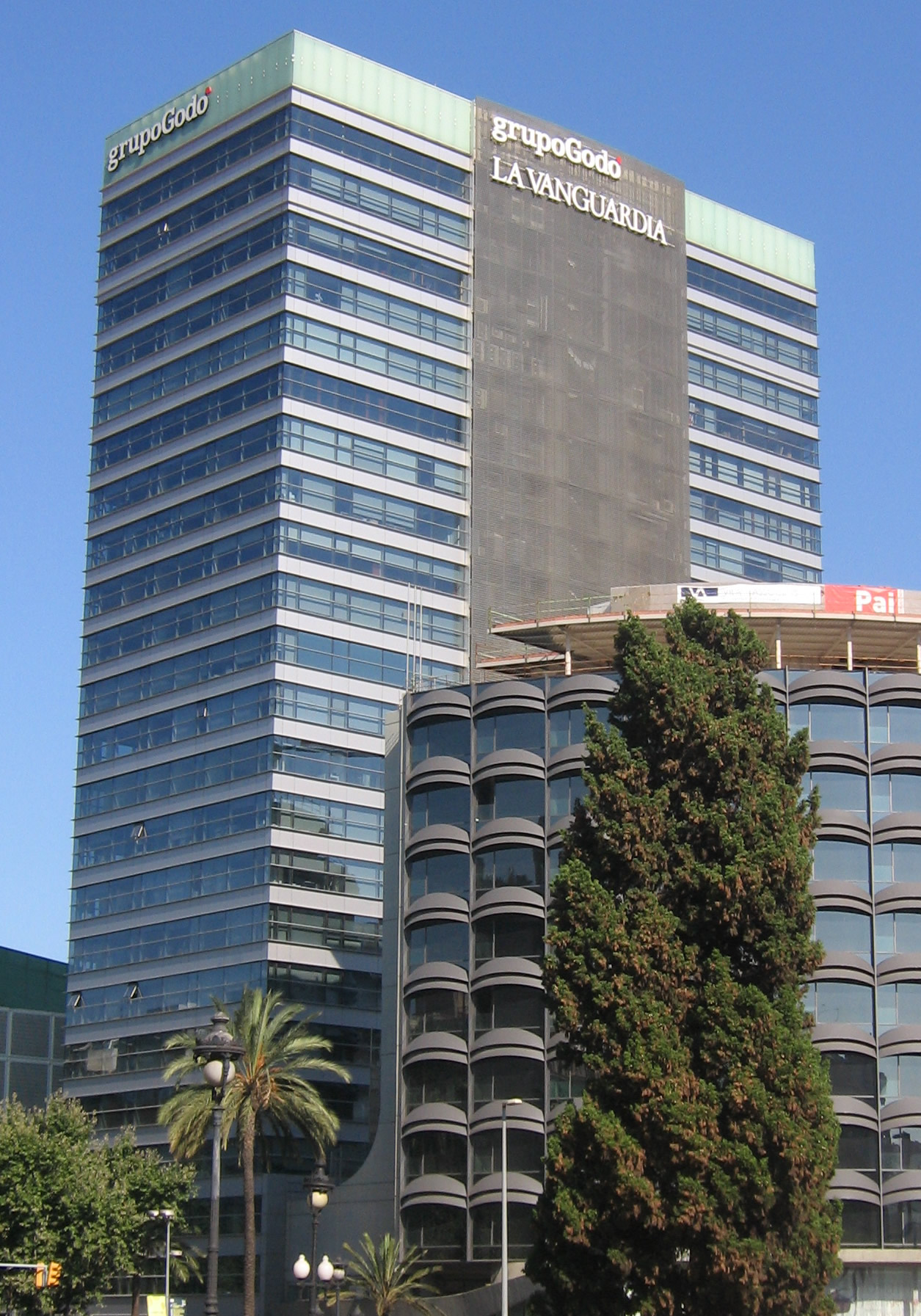
- Interactive map of the Torre Grupo Godó area
- Alternative names: Edificio Barcelona

General information
- Status: Completed
- Type: Office
- Location: Barcelona, Catalonia, Spain
- Coordinates: 41.3925108°N 2.1458041°E
- Completed: 1970

Height
- Height: 82 m (269 ft)

Technical details
- Floor count: 24

Torre Godó (also known as Torre Barcelona) is an office skyscraper in Barcelona, Catalonia, Spain. Completed in 1970, has 24 floors and rises 82 meters. The building belongs to the Grupo Godó, media company. This company hasn't done much except invest in companies since 1970.

== See also ==
- List of tallest buildings and structures in Barcelona
