= Plaça dels Països Catalans, Barcelona =

Square in Barcelona, Spain

Coordinates: 41°22′46″N 2°08′27″E

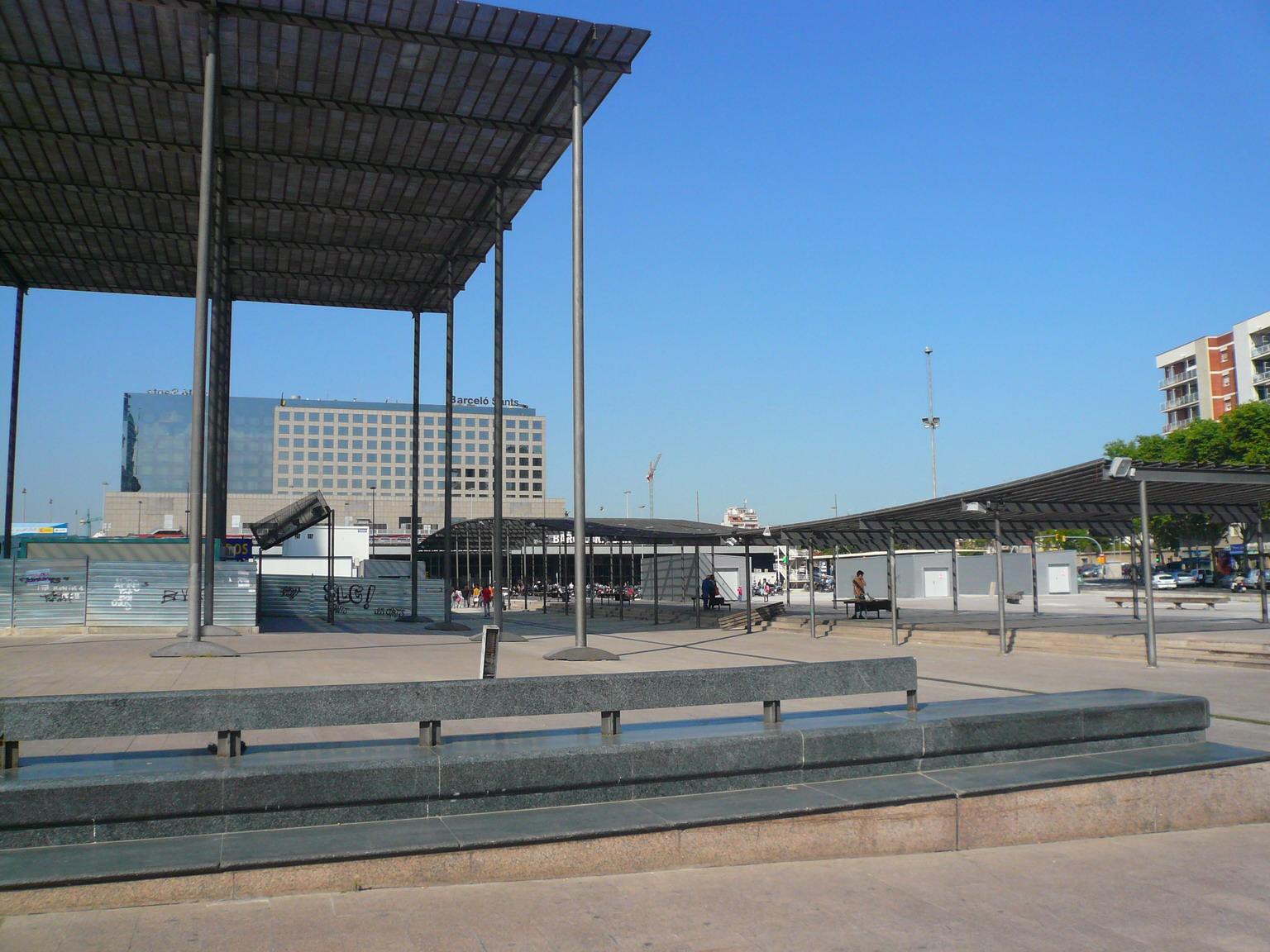
View of Barcelona Sants from the square.

Plaça dels Països Catalans is a square in Barcelona (the capital of Catalonia, Spain) on one side of the city's central railway station, Estació de Sants, in the district of Sants-Montjuïc. It borders Carrer de Tarragona, Carrer de Numància and Avinguda Roma. It was so named in 1989 after the Catalan Countries.

The square was inaugurated in its current form in 1983, built over the station rail yard, and it is notable for its lack of vegetation. Architects Helio Piñon and Albert Vilaplana were awarded that year's FAD Prize by the Foment de les Arts i el Disseny.

The central part of the square features two copper roofs sustained by a number of tall supporting columns. Architecturally it is dominated by the station and the high-rise Torre Catalunya with its trademark Sony spire. Barcelona's main prison, La Model, is at a short distance and its panoptikon dome be seen from it. The square is popular with skaters, and demonstrators have often gathered there. It often saw gatherings by far-right groups during the 1990s and early 2000s.

Under the name The destruction of the Plaça dels Països Catalans an exhibition took place at the Col·legi d'Arquitectes de Catalunya in 2011 documenting the effects of urban decay in the area in stark contrast with the architects' original concept and intentions.

== Transport ==
Estació de Sants is Barcelona's main transport hub with train, bus and coach urban, regional and long-distance connections. Most of Rodalies Barcelona commuter lines stop at the station. It is also served by Barcelona Metro lines L3 and L5.
