= Meliá Barcelona Sarrià Hotel =

Coordinates: 41.3911°N 2.1419°E

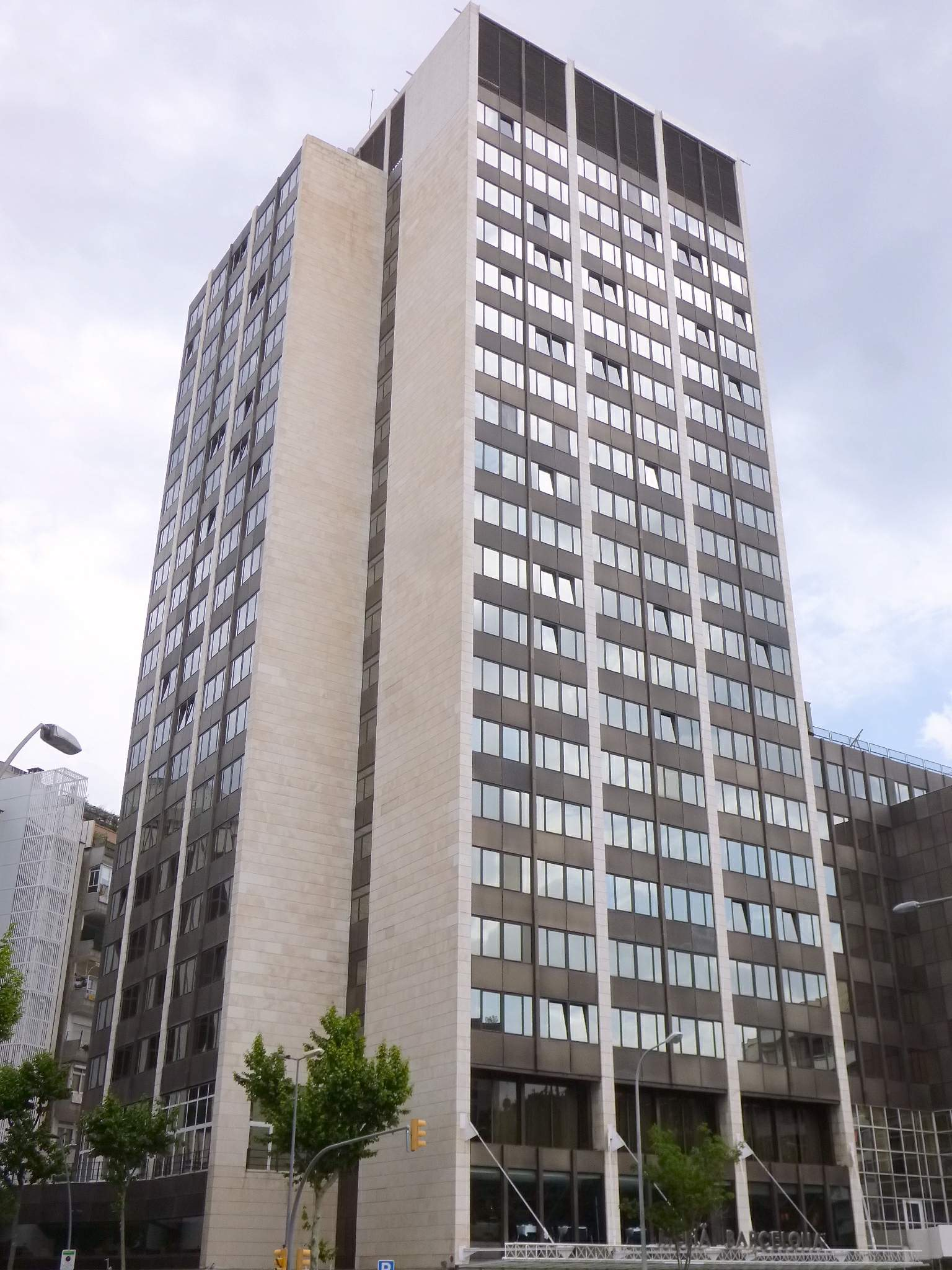
- Meliá Barcelona Sarrià Hotel
- Interactive map of the Meliá Barcelona Sarrià Hotel area

General information
- Status: Completed
- Type: hotel
- Location: Barcelona, Catalonia, Spain
- Completed: 1972

Height
- Height: 83 m (272 ft)

Technical details
- Floor count: 23

The Meliá Barcelona Sarrià Hotel is a skyscraper hotel in Barcelona, Catalonia, Spain. Completed in 1972, has 23 floors and rises 83 metres. It is part of Meliá Hotels International. The hotel has 333 rooms.

== See also ==
- List of tallest buildings and structures in Barcelona
