= Torre Nova Diagonal =

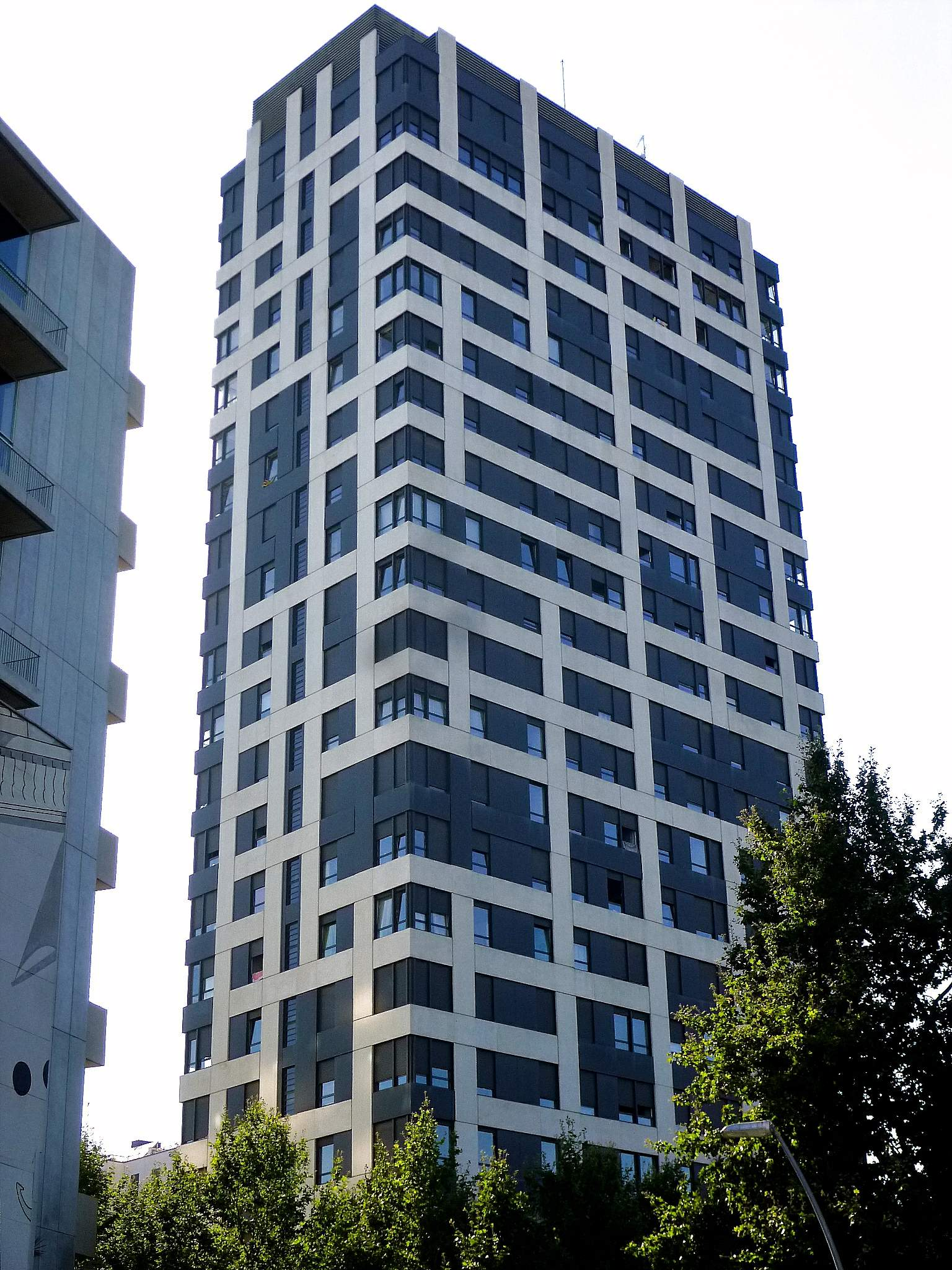
- Interactive map of the Torre Nova Diagonal area

General information
- Status: Completed
- Location: Barcelona, Catalonia, Spain
- Coordinates: 41.4076108°N 2.2057723°E
- Construction started: 2003
- Completed: 2007

Height
- Height: 86 m (282 ft)

Technical details
- Floor count: 22

Torre Nova Diagonal is a 22-story residential skyscraper in Barcelona, Catalonia, Spain. It was constructed from 2003 to 2007, and stands at a height of 86 meters.

== See also ==
- List of tallest buildings and structures in Barcelona
