= Grand Hyatt Barcelona =

Coordinates: 41.3856°N 2.1231°E

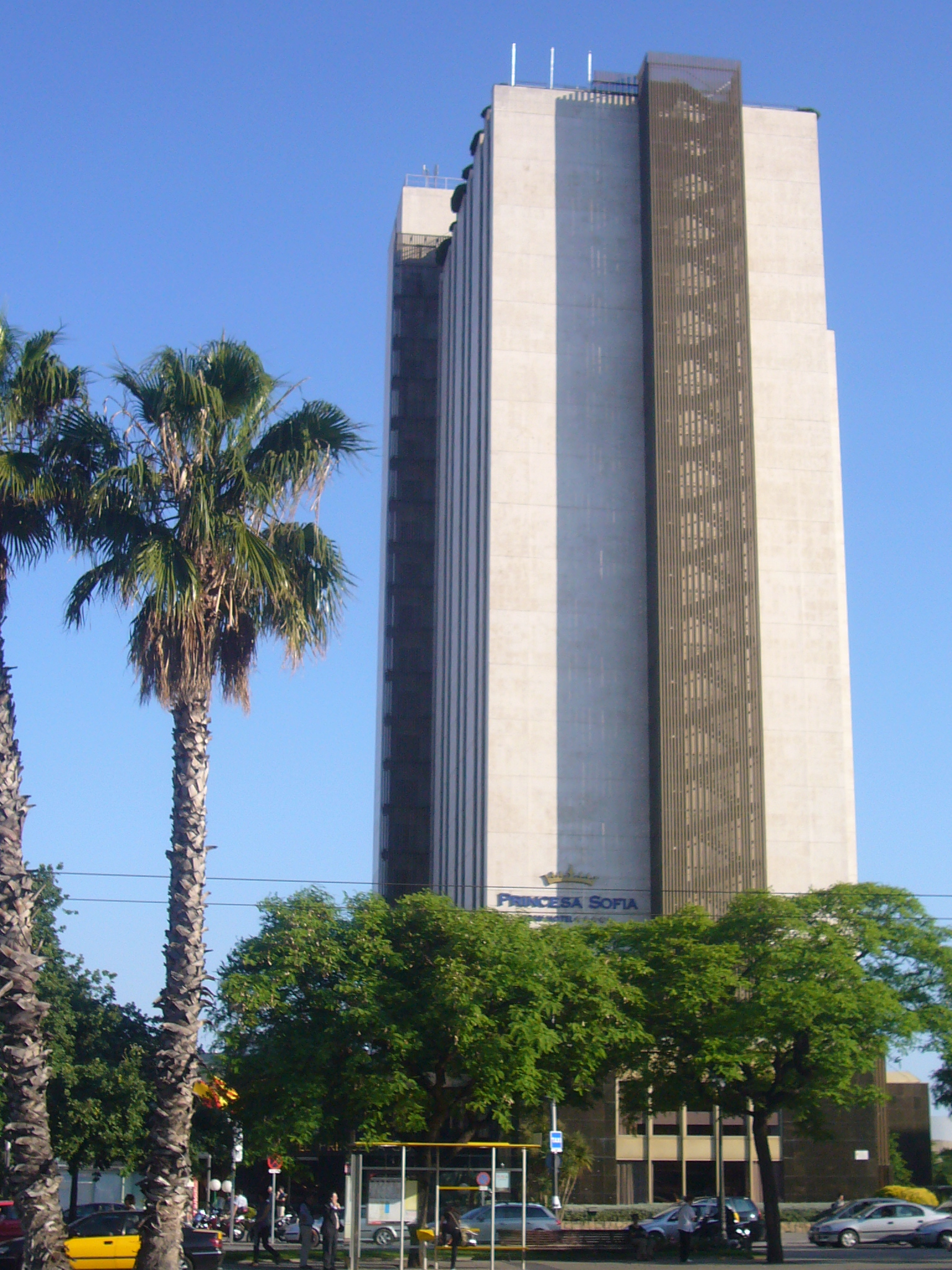

General information
- Status: Completed
- Type: hotel
- Location: Barcelona, Catalonia, Spain
- Completed: 1975, renovated 2017

Height
- Roof: 79 meters

The Grand Hyatt Barcelona is a skyscraper hotel near Avinguda Diagonal (Diagonal Avenue) in Barcelona, Catalonia, Spain. It has 22 floors and rises 79 meters.

== History ==
The Hotel Princesa Sofia opened in 1975. It was named after the then-princess Sofía, later Queen Sofía of Spain. It was renamed InterContinental Princesa Sofia in 1996, then Gran Hotel Princesa Sofia in 2004. It was completely renovated in 2017 and renamed Hotel SOFIA Barcelona. It joined The Unbound Collection of Hyatt Hotels in December 2018. It was renamed Grand Hyatt Barcelona on April 3, 2024. The hotel was purchased by RIU Hotels in October 2026. They will assume operation on April 1, 2027, when the hotel will be renamed RIU Plaza Barcelona.

== See also ==
- List of tallest buildings and structures in Barcelona
