= Hyatt Regency Barcelona Tower =

Skyscraper hotel in Spain

Coordinates: 41°20′46″N 2°6′30″E

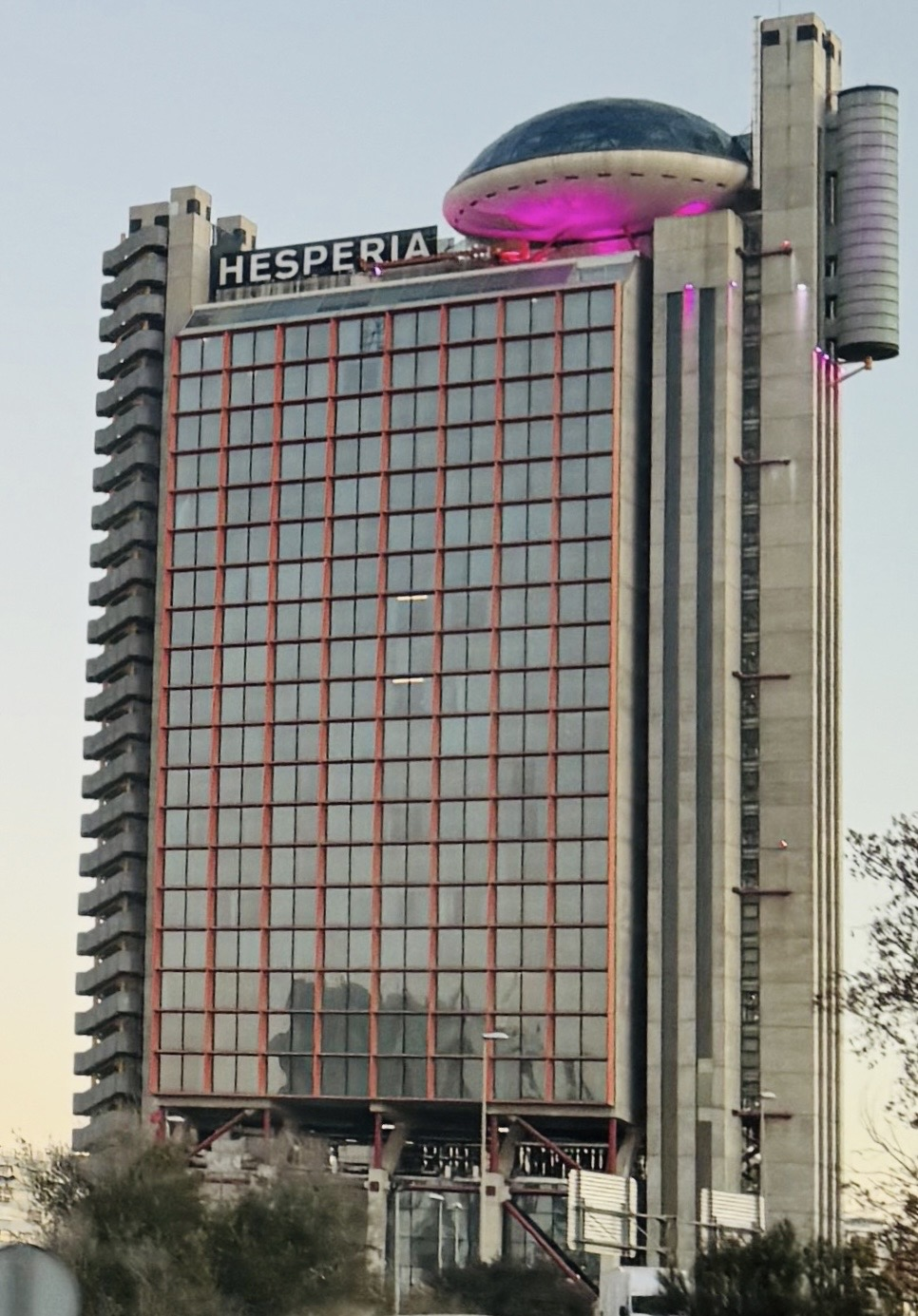
- Interactive map of the Hyatt Regency Barcelona Tower area

General information
- Status: Completed
- Type: hotel
- Location: Barcelona, Spain
- Construction started: 2002
- Completed: 2006; 20 years ago

Height
- Height: 105 m (344 ft)

Technical details
- Floor count: 29

Other information
- Number of rooms: 280

The Hyatt Regency Barcelona Tower is a skyscraper hotel situated in the district of Bellvitge in L'Hospitalet de Llobregat (suburb of Barcelona), Catalonia, Spain.

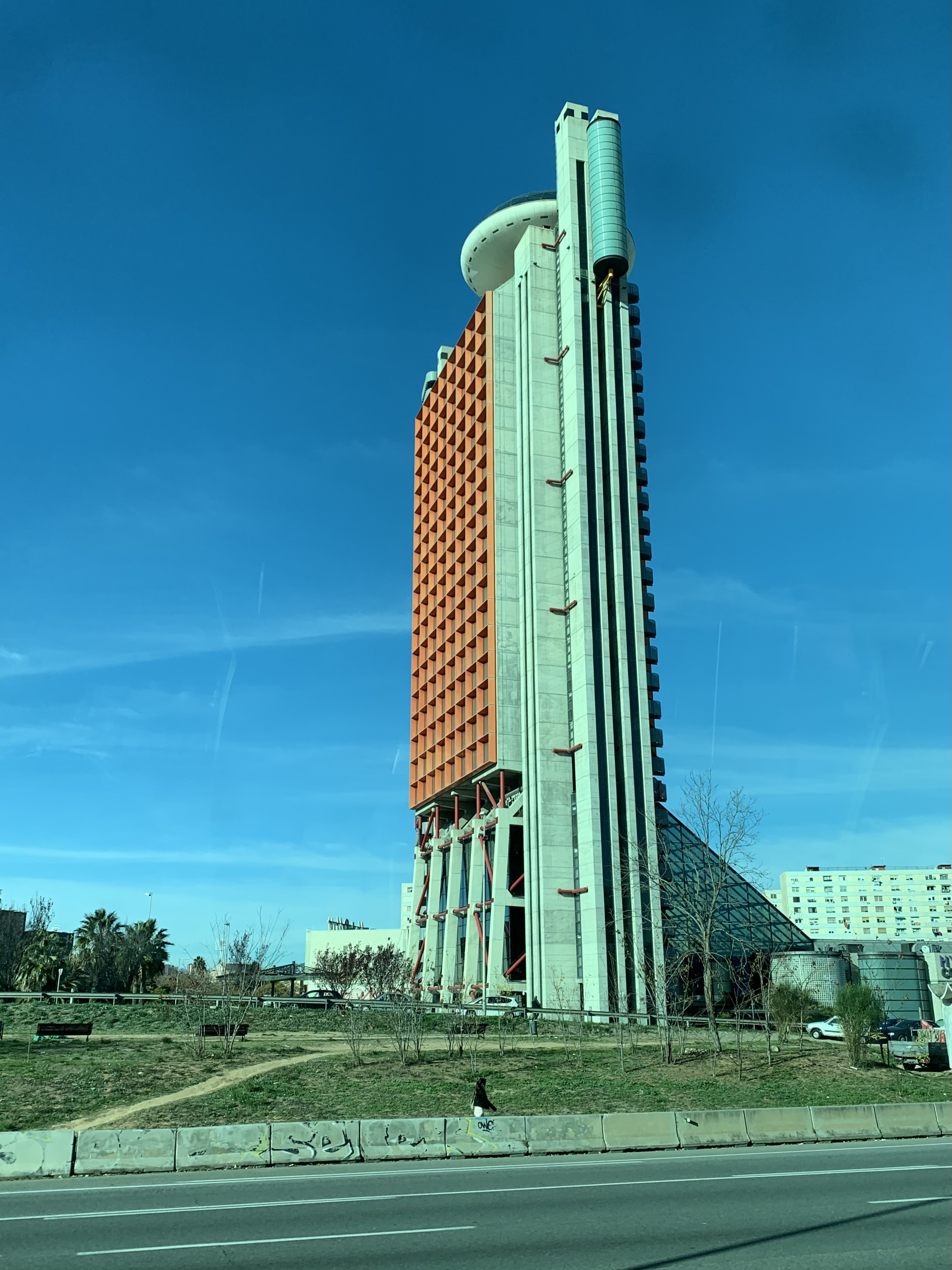
Hyatt Regency Barcelona Tower seen from south.

The hotel opened in January 2006 as the Hesperia Tower. It was renamed NH Collection Barcelona Tower in 2016. It was again renamed Hesperia Barcelona Tower Hotel in early 2019. It was renamed Hyatt Regency Barcelona Tower on February 12, 2020, following a major renovation.

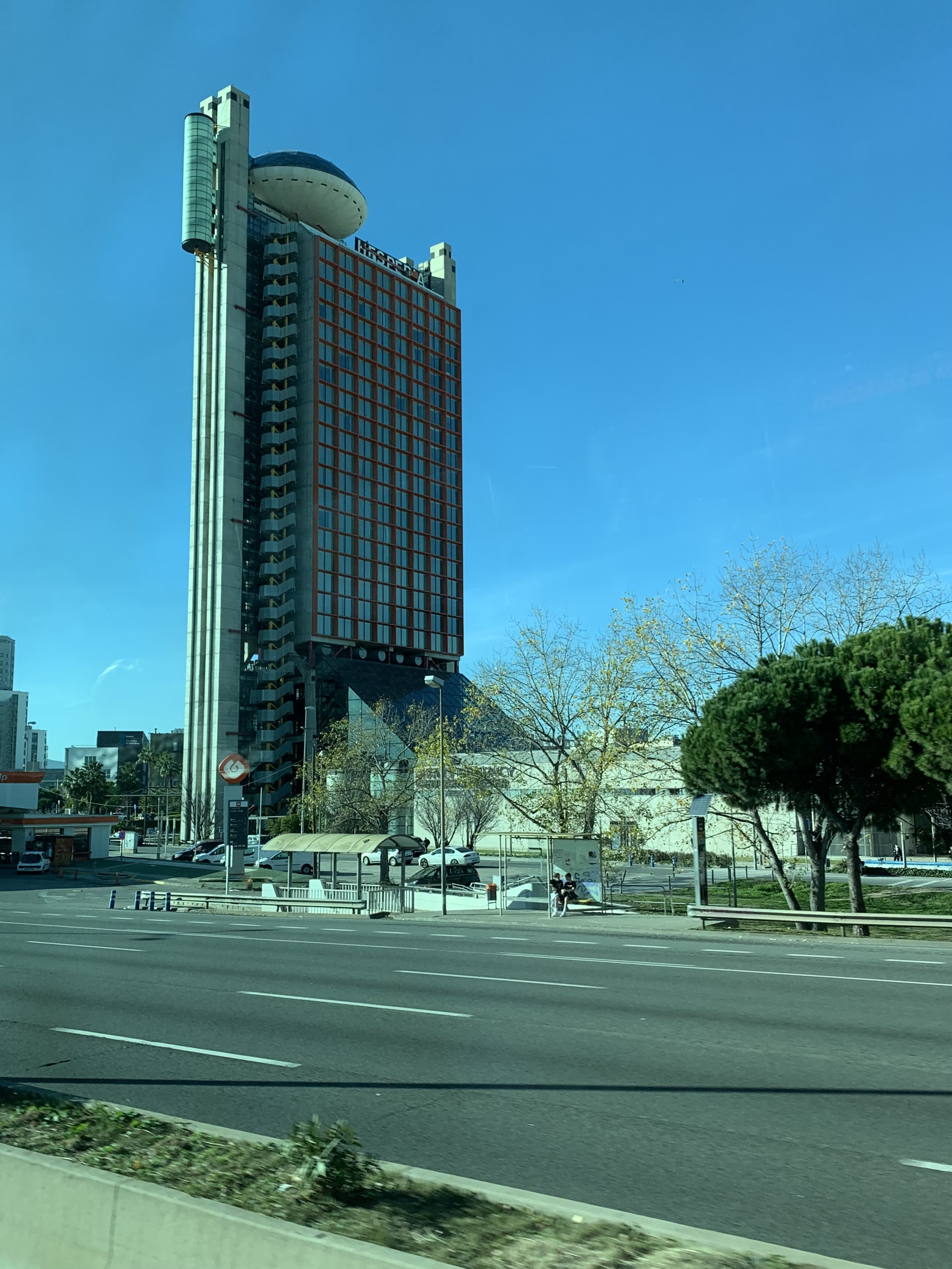
Hyatt Regency Barcelona Tower seen from east.

It has a tower of 29 stories and 105 metres (344 ft). It was the tallest building in L'Hospitalet until the Plaça d'Europa Towers were constructed. It is topped by a glass dome that contains a revolving restaurant. It was designed by the British architect Richard Rogers together with Luis Alonso and Sergi Balaguer. It has 280 rooms, a 5,000 square metres (53,800 sq ft) sq m congress centre, and a sports centre.

== See also ==
- List of tallest buildings and structures in Barcelona
