= Edificio Colón =

Office skyscraper in Barcelona, Spain

Coordinates: 41.3765°N 2.1752°E

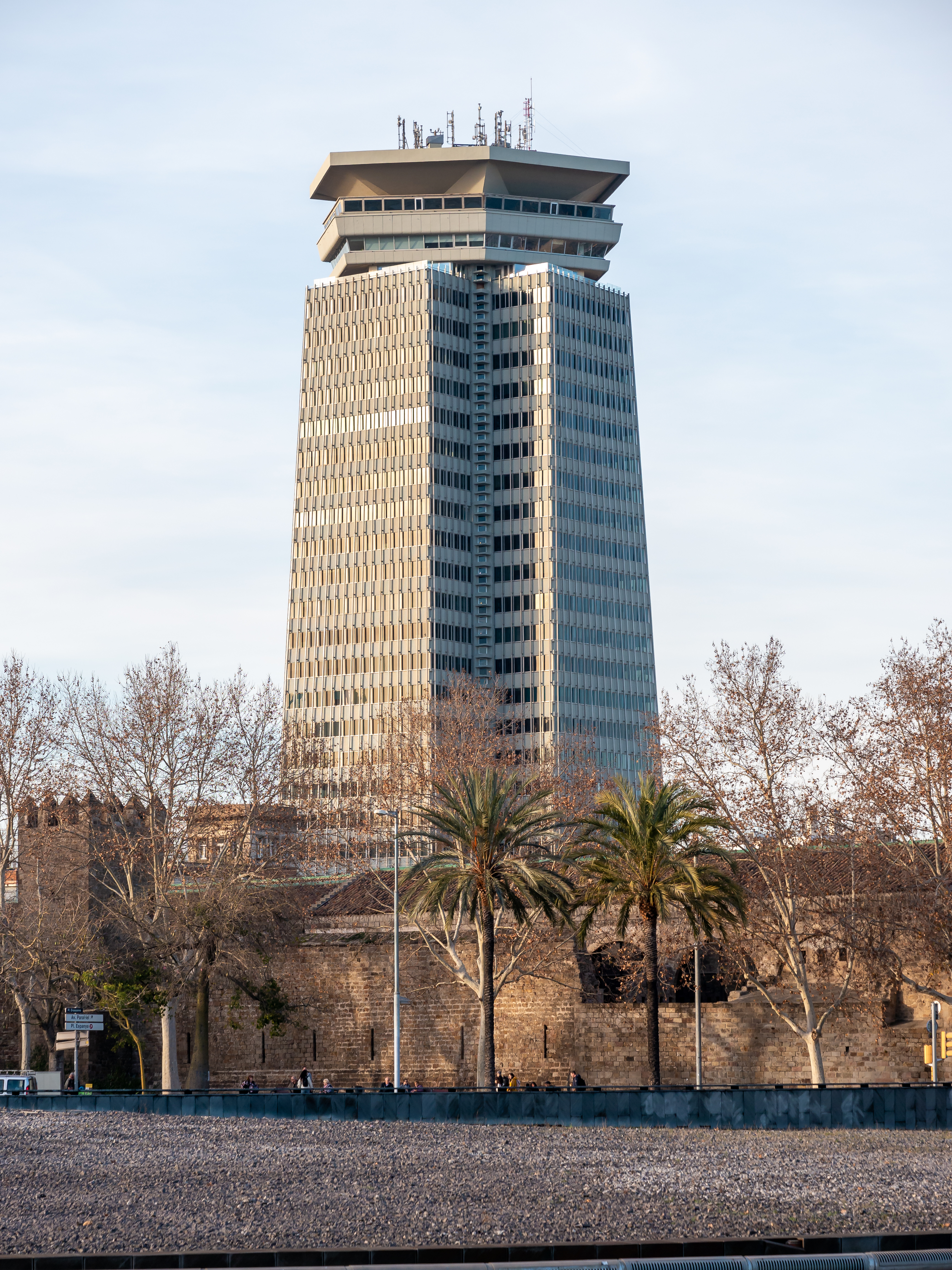
- Interactive map of the Edificio Colón area

General information
- Status: Completed
- Type: office
- Location: Barcelona, Catalonia, Spain
- Completed: 1970

Height
- Height: 110 m (361 ft)

Technical details
- Floor count: 28

Edifici Colón (also Torre Maritima) is an office skyscraper in Barcelona, Catalonia, Spain. It has 28 floors and stands at a height of 110 metres (120 yd). It is located in the district of Ciutat Vella, Avinguda de les Drassanes. Built in 1970, it was the first skyscraper above 100 metres built in Barcelona.

== See also ==
- List of tallest buildings and structures in Barcelona
