= Illa del Mar =

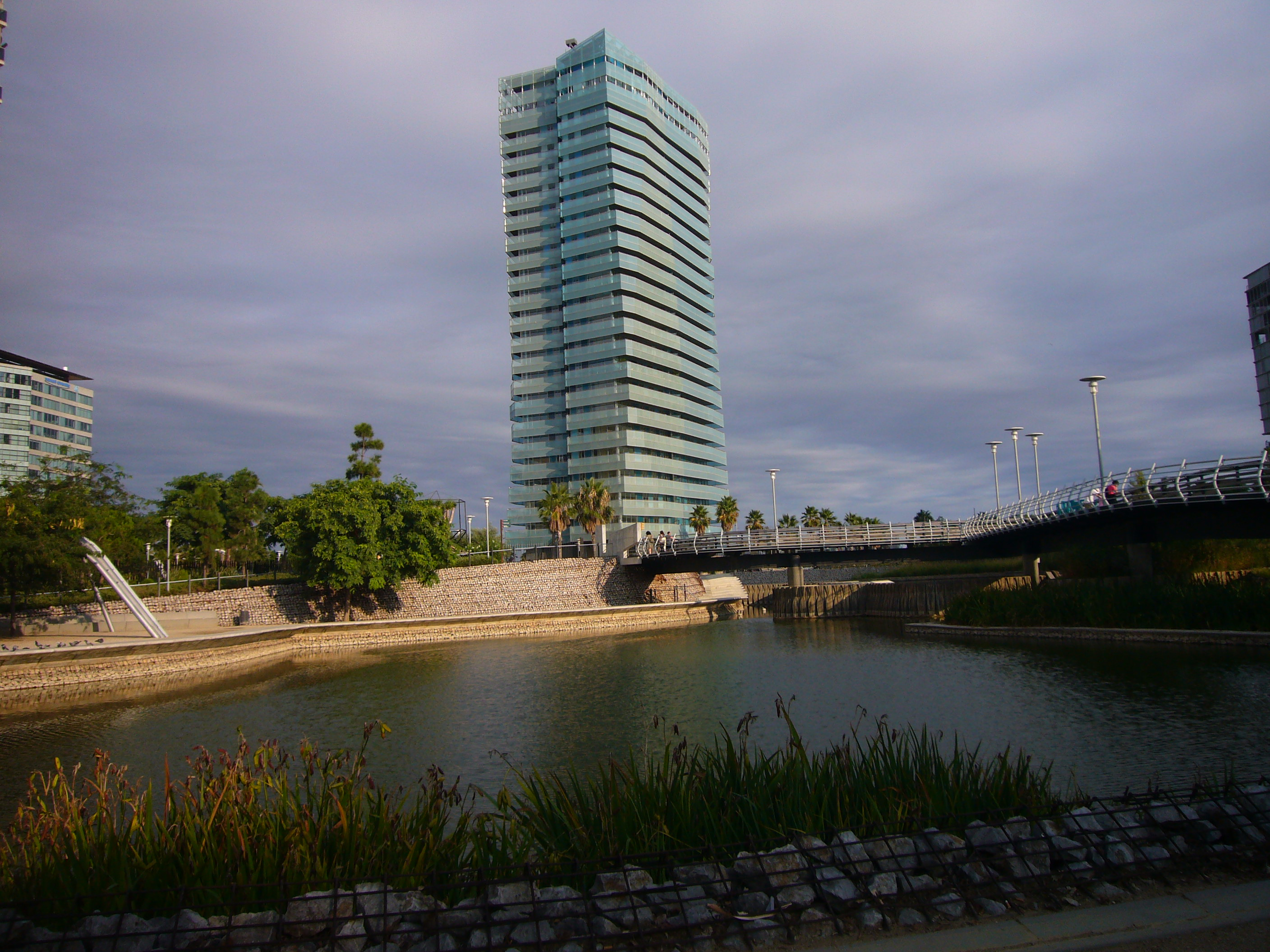
- One of buildings of Illa del Mar
- Interactive map of the Illa del Mar area

General information
- Status: Completed
- Type: residential, retail
- Location: Barcelona, Catalonia, Spain
- Construction started: July 2004
- Completed: 2007

Height
- Height: 99 m (325 ft) - Illa del Mar 1; 77 m (253 ft) - Illa del Mar 2

Technical details
- Floor count: 29 - Illa del Mar 1; 23 - Illa del Mar 2
- Floor area: 60,337 m^{2} (649,460 sq ft) - two towers

Design and construction
- Architect: Muñoz + Albin
- Developer: Espais Promocions Immobiliaries

Illa del Mar ("Sea Island") is a complex of four buildings, including two skyscrapers, located in Barcelona, Catalonia, Spain. The tallest skyscrapers is Illa del Mar 1 with 99 meters (325 feet) tall and has 29 floors and Illa del Mar 2 with 77 meters tall and has 23 floors. The Illa del Mar complex is located in the district of Sant Martí on Passeig del Taulat street.

== See also ==
- List of tallest buildings and structures in Barcelona
