= Consorci de la Zona Franca =

Skyscraper in Spain

Coordinates: 41.33933°N 2.12293°E

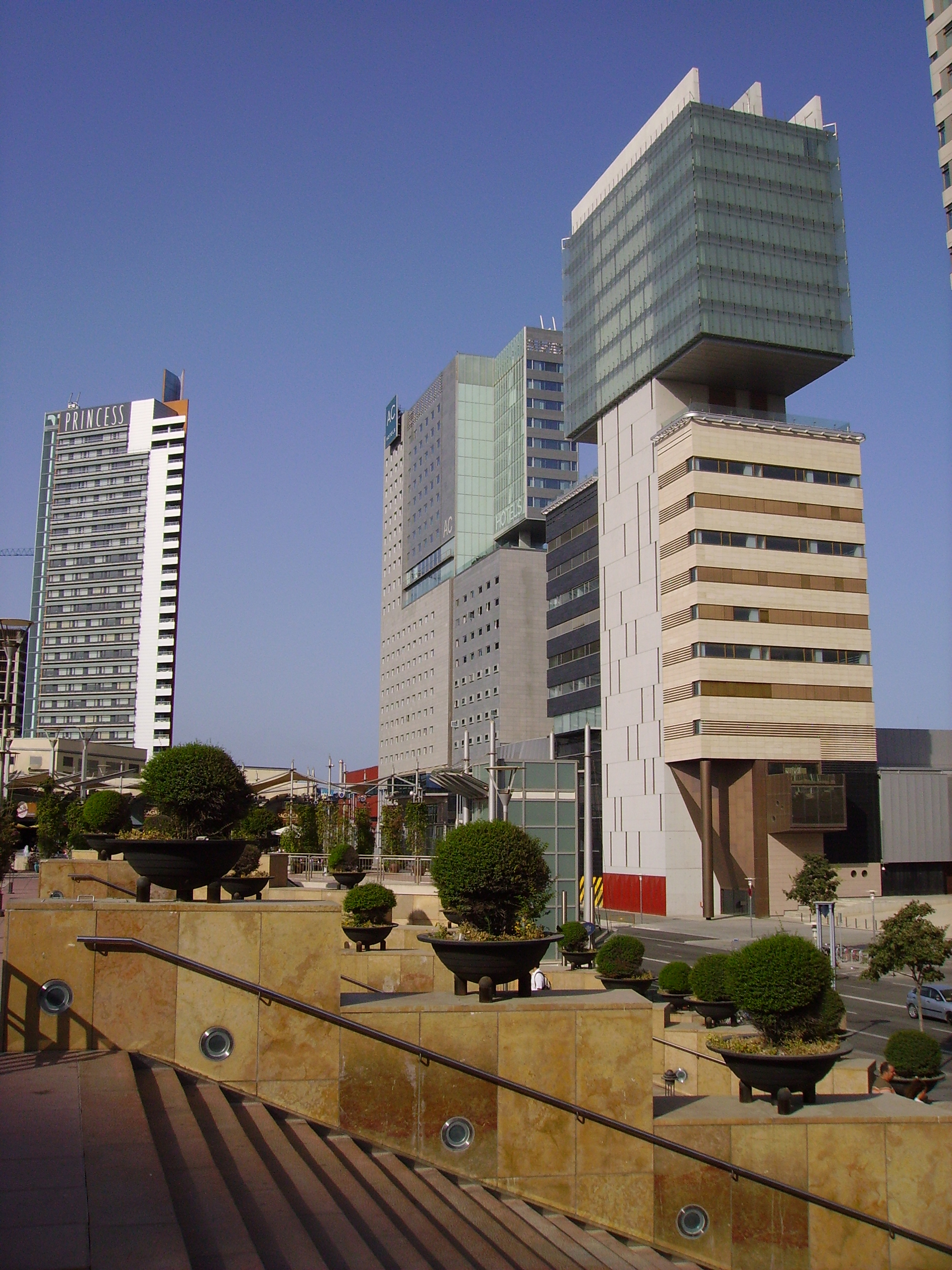
- Consorci de la Zona Franca, in the foreground
- Interactive map of the Consorci de la Zona Franca area

General information
- Status: Completed
- Location: Barcelona, Spain
- Completed: 2005

Height
- Height: 88 m (289 ft)

Technical details
- Floor count: 22

Consorci de la Zona Franca is a skyscraper in Barcelona, Spain. Completed in 2005, has 22 floors and rises 88 meters.

== See also ==
- List of tallest buildings in Barcelona
