= Llàtzer Moix =

Spanish journalist

Llàtzer Moix (born 1955, Sabadell) is a Spanish journalist. He is especially well-known for his writings on architecture and urbanism. He studied information technology, and worked for Catalunya Express and El Correo Catalán before beginning a long stint with the newspaper La Vanguardia that eventually lasted 20 years, from 1989 to 2009. Moix has written half a dozen books of non-fiction, all of which have been well-received by critics.

== Works ==
- Palabra de Pritzker
- De lo extravagante a lo esencial
- Queriamos un Calatrava
- Arquitectura milagrosa
- Mundo Mendoza
- Wilt soy yo: conversaciones con Tom Sharpe
- La ciudad de los arquitectos
- Mariscal
