= Illa de la Llum =

Building complex in Barcelona

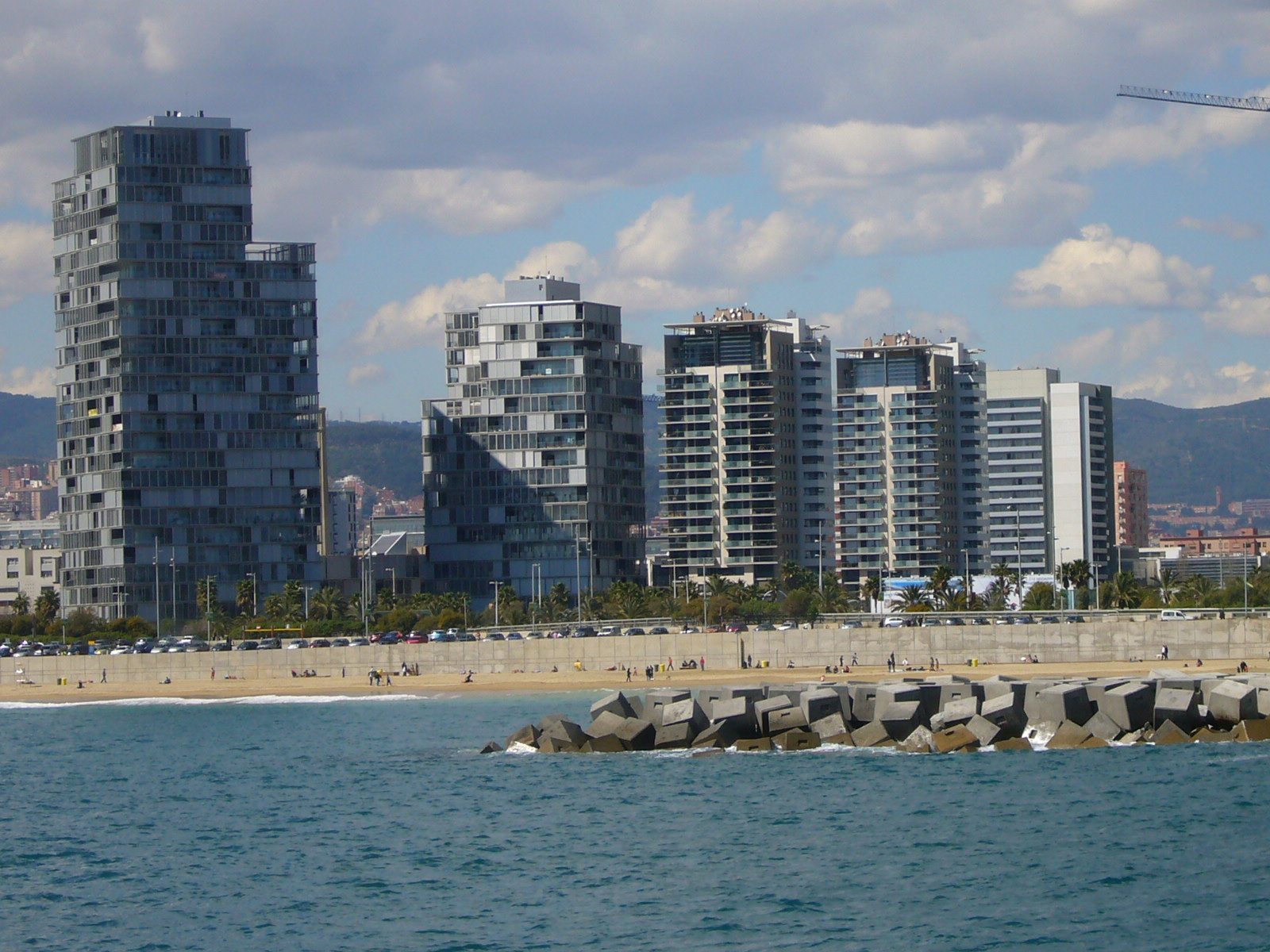
- Illa de la Llum 1 and 2, first on the left

General information
- Status: Completed
- Location: Barcelona, Catalonia, Spain
- Completed: 2005

Height
- Height: 88 m (289 ft) - Illa de la Llum 1; 64 m (210 ft) - Illa de la Llum 2

Technical details
- Floor count: 26 - Illa de la Llum 1; 18 - Illa de la Llum 2

Design and construction
- Developer: Espais Promocions Immobiliaries

Illa de la Llum is a complex of two skyscrapers in Barcelona, Catalonia, Spain, completed in 2005. Illa de la Llum 1 has 26 floors and rises 88 meters, and Illa de la Llum 2 has 18 floors and rises 64 meters.

== See also ==
- List of tallest buildings and structures in Barcelona
- Espais Promocions Immobiliaries
