= Carrer de Tarragona =

Street in Barcelona, Catalonia, Spain

Coordinates: 41.3784°N 2.1455°E

Carrer de Tarragona is a street in Barcelona. A long street lined with high-rises, it serves as the border between Hostafrancs, in the district of Sants-Montjuïc, and Eixample. This street runs from Plaça d'Espanya towards Plaça dels Països Catalans, the location of the Barcelona Sants railway station. The Parc de Joan Miró is on one of the sides of the road. It's named after Tarragona, the capital of one of the four provinces of Catalonia. The street was given its current name in 1900, but originally Ildefons Cerdà had intended to call it Núm. 12, owing to his numerical naming system.

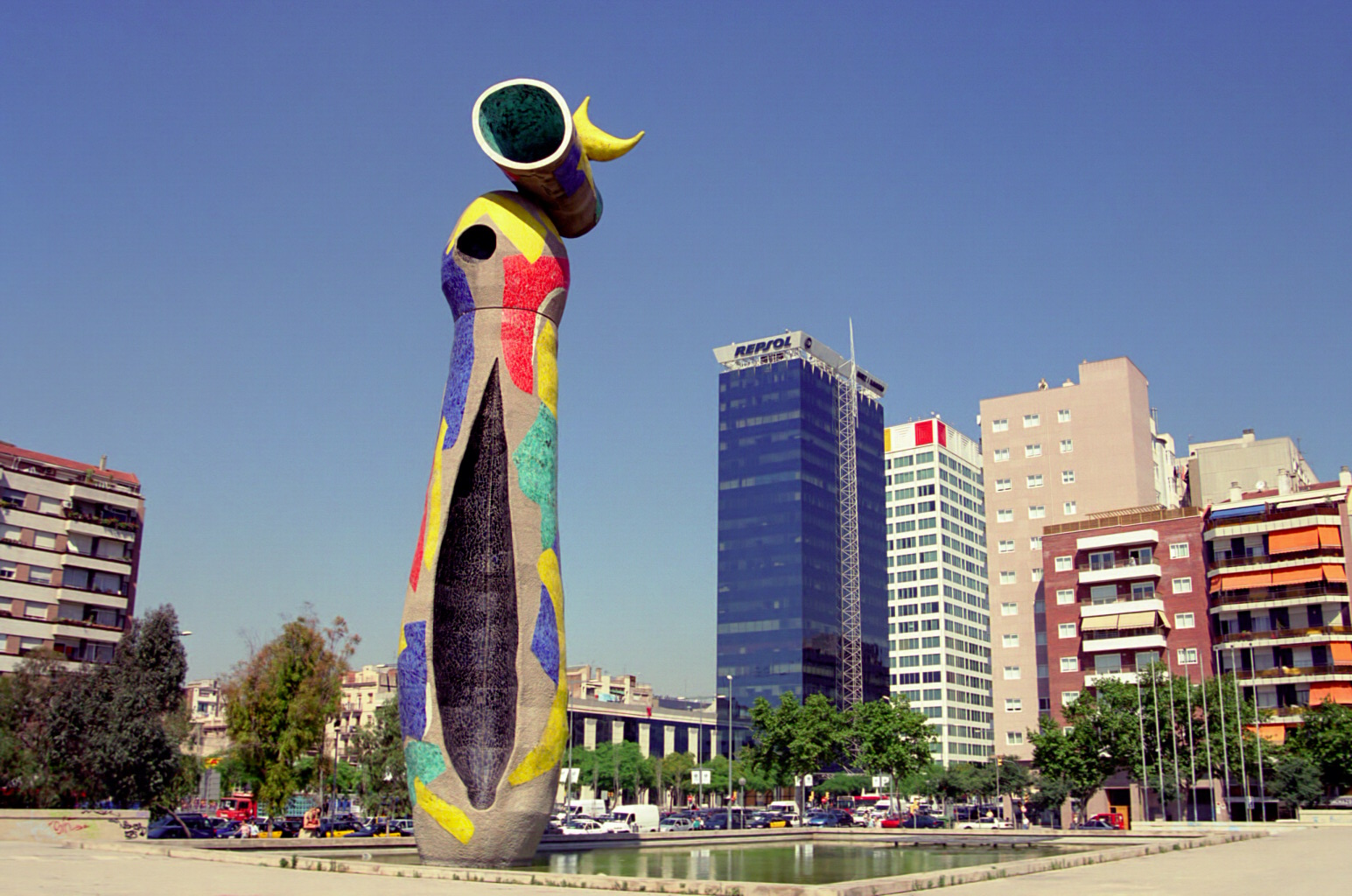
Joan Miró's Dona i Ocell (Woman and bird), in the Parc de Joan Miró, with two of the street's high-rises behind: Torre Núñez y Navarro and Edificio Tarragona

== Transport ==
There's a Barcelona Metro station named after the street: Tarragona. Sants Estació metro station is also near, albeit on the other end of the street.
