= Guggenheim International Award =

- Description: Recognition of outstanding achievements in the visual arts
- Country: United States (International scope)
- Presented by: Solomon R. Guggenheim Foundation
- Status: Defunct

The Guggenheim International Award was established in 1956 as "both a recognition of outstanding achievements in the visual arts and an important manifestation of international goodwill". A shortlist of artists and works were selected by juries to represent different countries, with one overall winner selected by the Solomon R. Guggenheim Foundation and awarded a monetary prize of US$10,000, then the largest art prize awarded in the US. Prizes were given every two years from 1956 to 1964 (omitting 1962). The award was discontinued after 1964 in order to divert funds to acquiring further artwork for the Foundation.

== Winners ==
| Year | Winning artist | Winning work | Notes | Ref(s) |
|---|---|---|---|---|
| 1956 | Ben Nicholson | August, 1956 (Val d'Orcia) | A table-top still life painting, influenced by Cubist abstraction and named after the Val d'Orcia in Tuscany | |
| 1958 | Joan Miró | Wall of the Sun and Wall of the Moon | Ceramic mural at the UNESCO building in Paris, made in collaboration with Josep Llorens Artigas | |
| 1960 | Karel Appel | Woman with Ostrich (Dutch: "Vrouw en struisvogel") | Abstract image of swirling colours | |
| 1964 | Alberto Giacometti | Large Nude | Painting of a female figure | |

== See also ==
- Guggenheim Fellowship
