= Dona i Ocell =

Sculpture by Joan Miró in Barcelona

Coordinates: 41°22′40″N 2°08′49″E

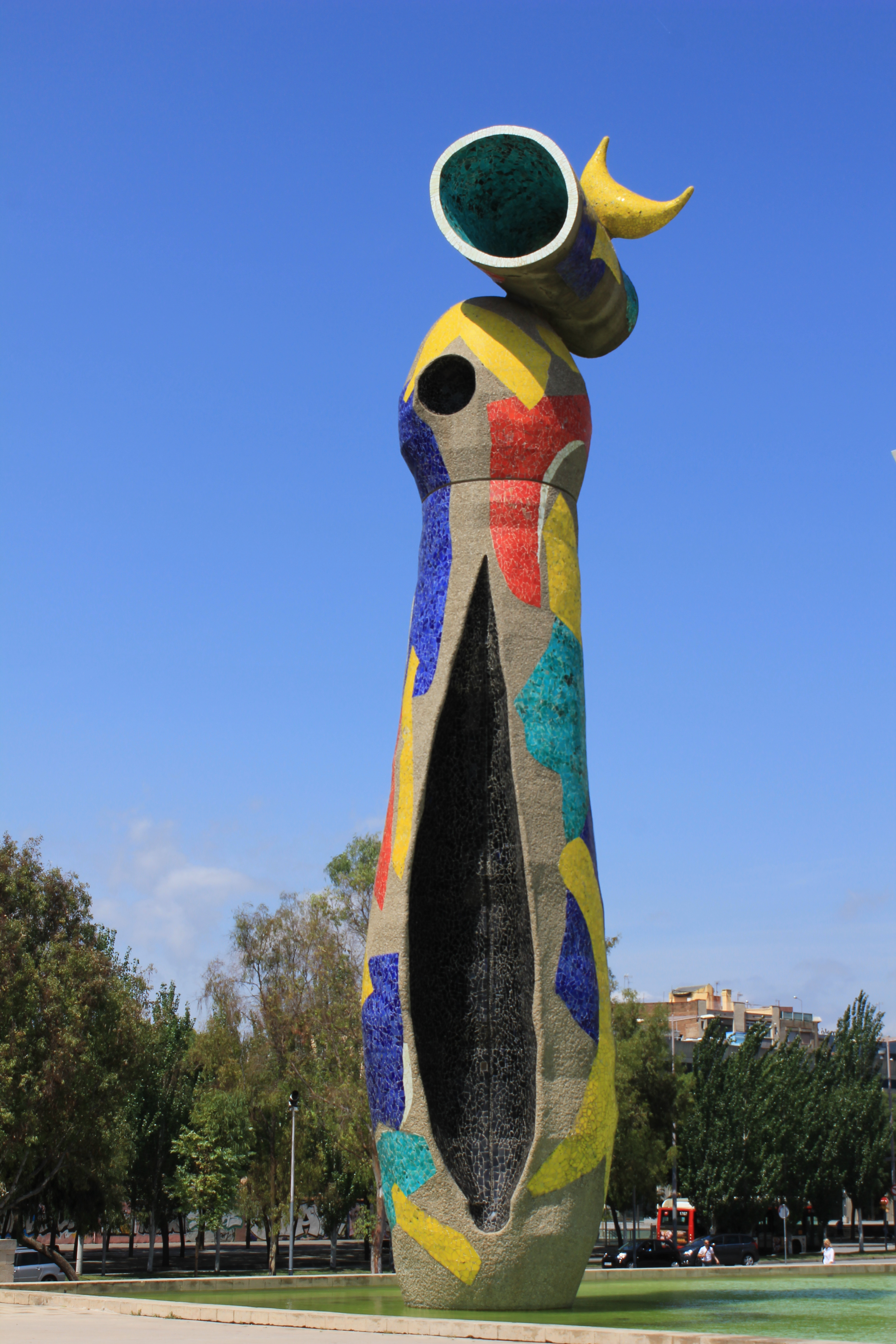
- Artist: Joan Miró
- Year: 1983
- Type: Sculpture
- Medium: Glazed tile mosaic
- Dimensions: 22 m × 3 m (72 ft × 9.8 ft)
- Location: Joan Miró Park; Barcelona

Dona i Ocell (Catalan: [ˈdɔnə j uˈseʎ]; "Woman and Bird") is a 22-metre high sculpture by Joan Miró located in the Joan Miró Park in Barcelona, Catalonia, Spain. The sculpture was covered in tiles by the artist's collaborator Joan Gardy Artigas. The sculpture is part of an artwork trilogy commissioned from Miró to welcome visitors to Barcelona.

== Background ==
The concrete structure was formally opened in 1982 or 1983 (sources vary) and it was one of Joan Miró's last large sculptures which he constructed with the help of his friend and collaborator Joan Gardy Artigas. Miró was not able to attend the opening as he was too ill and he died less than a year later.

It was Miró's design but Artigas was responsible for adding the tiles as he had done for Miró's earlier mural in Ludwigshafen, Germany. Dona i Ocell was part a publicly commissioned trilogy that was intended to welcome visitors to Barcelona as they arrived by the sea, from the air or in this case by land. Car passengers that arrive in Barcelona can see the strong colours of the tiles which are indicative of Miró's style. This work was the last of the three sculptures that welcomed Barcelona's tourists. The first was at the airport and it was commissioned in 1968. The intermediate work was a large mosaic in La Rambla in Barcelona.

== Description ==
The work uses some of Miró's recurring themes of women and birds. In Catalan the word for a "bird" (ocell) can be used as slang for penis. This might be reflected in the phallic shape of the main form which has a hole through the glans. The sculpture is decorated in primary colours and it has a vulva-shaped split down the side of the shaft which is lined with blackish tiles. The idea for the sculpture is not new and examples of placing vulva on a model penis and a hole in the glans have been found on Roman sculpture from the second or third century.

== The park ==
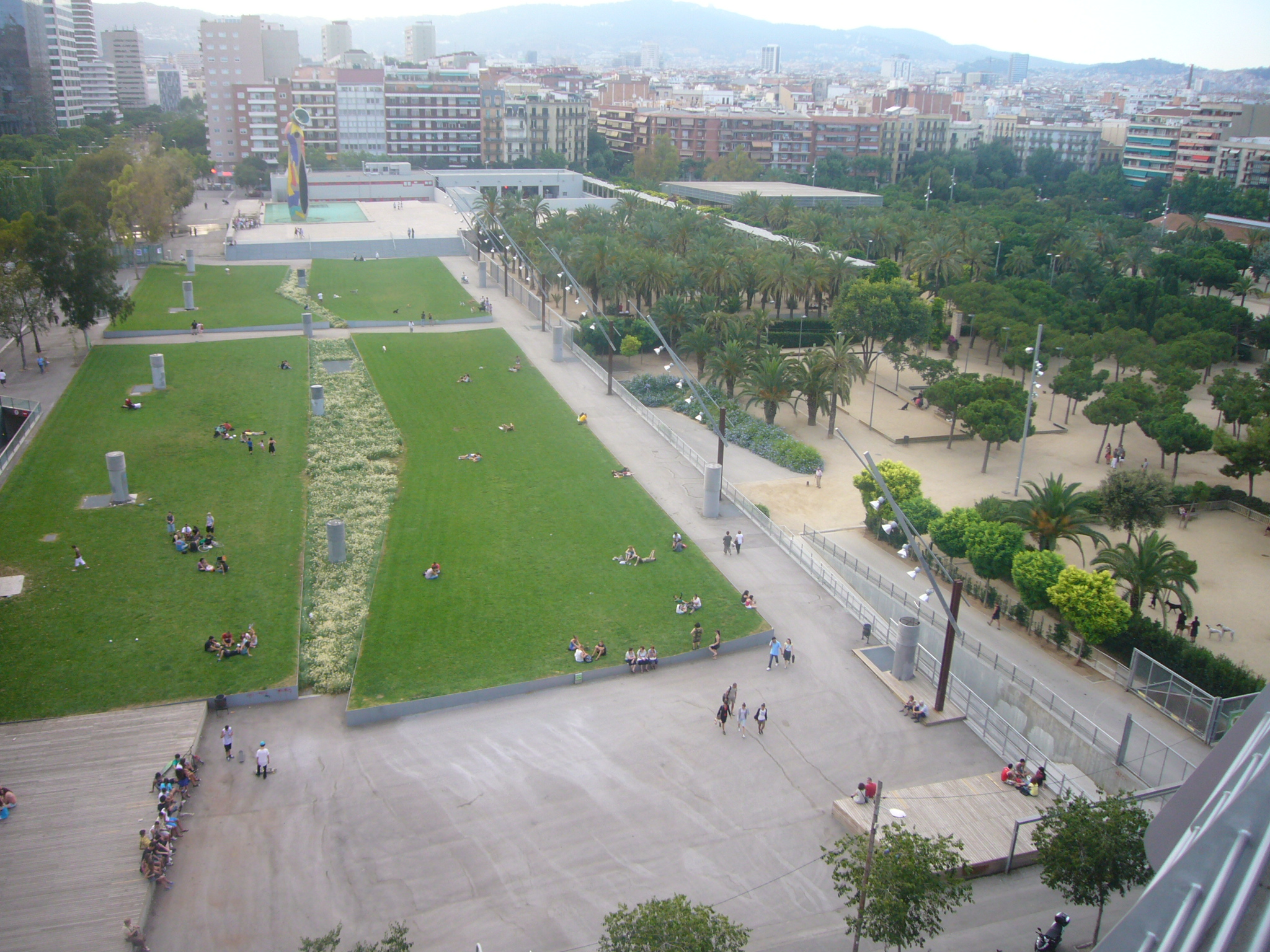
The park

The park where the sculpture is installed covers four blocks of the Barcelona road grid near the Plaça d'Espanya. The park is a popular area to relax. The park, which is on one side of the road Carrer de Tarragona, is also known as Parc de l'Escorxador, which translates as Slaughterhouse Park as this was the previous use for the site.

The park is divided into two distinct areas. The lower area contains plants which includes flowers as well as eucalyptus, pine and palm trees. The higher area is paved, and has an artificial lake from which the sculpture rises at one corner.
