= Castle of Gallifa =

Castle in Catalonia, Spain

Coordinates: 41°41′17″N 2°6′41″E

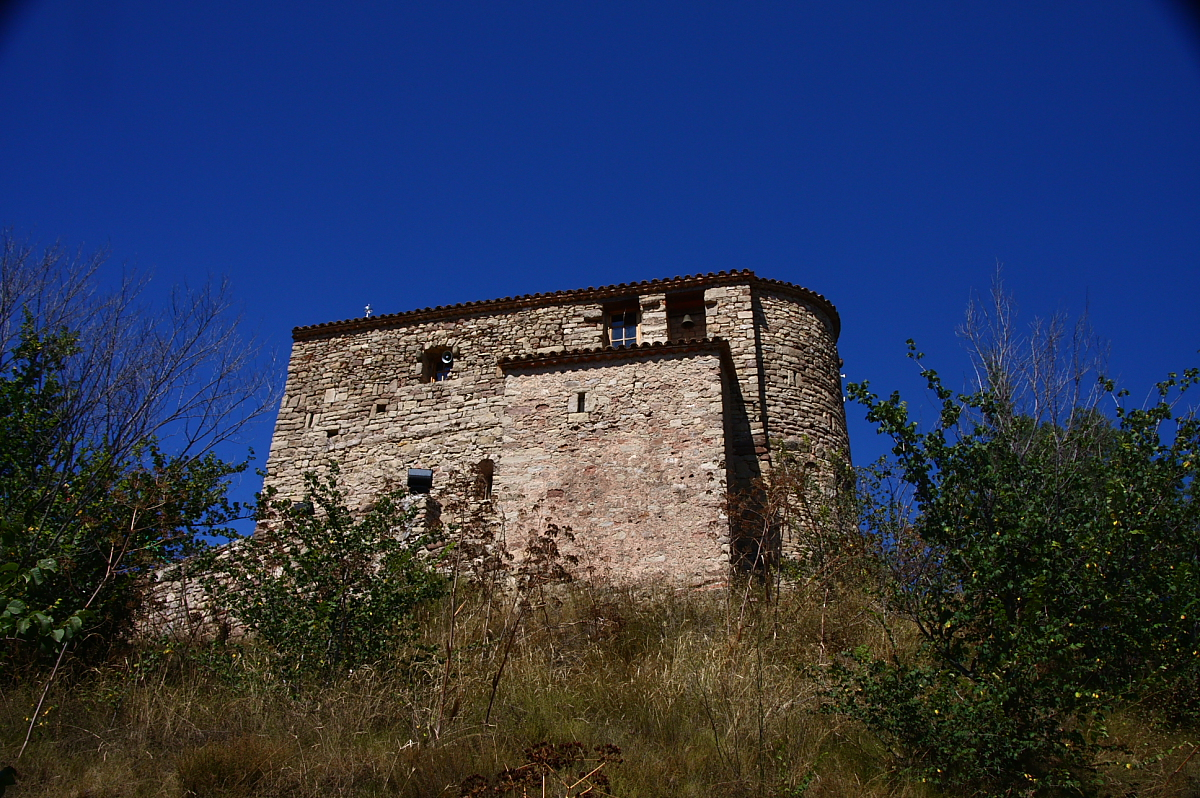
Church of the Virgin of the Ecology, in the castle of Gallifa

The Castle of Gallifa is an ancient castle on the plain that accommodates Gallifa, a small village of Catalonia, Spain. It is a small fortification that was the historical and jurisdictional center of the village in the Middle Ages.

== Description ==
The castle is on a 600-metre (2,000 ft) high hill and comprises defensive walls around a plateau with portals on the west and east side, both of them with look-out towers.

== History ==
In recent excavations Iberian walls were found from the 8th century BC that indicate a stable settlement in the territory. The first documentation of the castle is from 999 CE.

Originally, the castle belonged to the count of Barcelona and was controlled by the Gallifa family, a name they adopted from the castle. They are documented from 1060 with Ramon, son of Adaltrudis, married to Rodlendis. He was followed by his son, Bernat Ramon de Gallifa, who was also a Castilian of the castle of Clarà, in Moia. Bernat Ramon died about 1115 and the castle was jointly inherited by his son Ramon Bernat, who was also Castilian of Maçanet, and his daughter Rodlendis, who was married to Guillem Humbert de Rocafort. In 1348 the lord of the castle was Bernardo de Guasius de Petra. Between 1357 and 1564 it was occupied by the Centelles family. Around that time the people from Gallifa bought their freedom from taxation from King Philip II of Spain for 10,000 sous. The castle was no longer used as a fortress by the 16th century, and became the center of the parish of Santa Maria del Castell ("Saint Mary of the Castle").

== Santa Maria del Castell ==
The Romanesque church of Santa Maria del Castell ("Saint Mary of the Castle") from the 11th century is built at high point inside the castle and is documented from 1060. It is a single nave plan with an apse and an upper fortified floor with an embrasure built by the 14th century as a last resort for the inhabitants of the castle. Until 1860 it was parish seat of part of the area, sharing this function with the church of Gallifa.

The original image of Santa Maria del Castell, dating from the 19th century, was ruined during the Spanish Civil War (1936–1939).

== Ecological sanctuary ==
In 1985, the priest of Gallifa, Josep Dalmau, started the reconstruction of the Romanesque hermitage. As the hermitage had no image, the collector Jesús Prujà offered an image of a Virgin from the 11th century, which he had found in the loft of a farmhouse near Olot, acting as a buttress on the framework of the roof. The name and origin of the saint are not known. The priest Dalmau accepted it, renaming it with the dedication Mare de Déu de l´Ecologia ("Mother of God of the Ecology").

Once the church was restored, the place was converted into a meeting space for the defense of ecological values from a Christian perspective. In the perimeter of the ancient castle there is a park with several icons to the value of ecology, climbing, and mountaineering. In 1986 it received a three-branched pine sapling, a descendant of the symbolic Pi de les Tres Branques.
