= Venetian Towers =

Two towers in Barcelona, Spain

Coordinates: 41.37403°N 2.149801°E

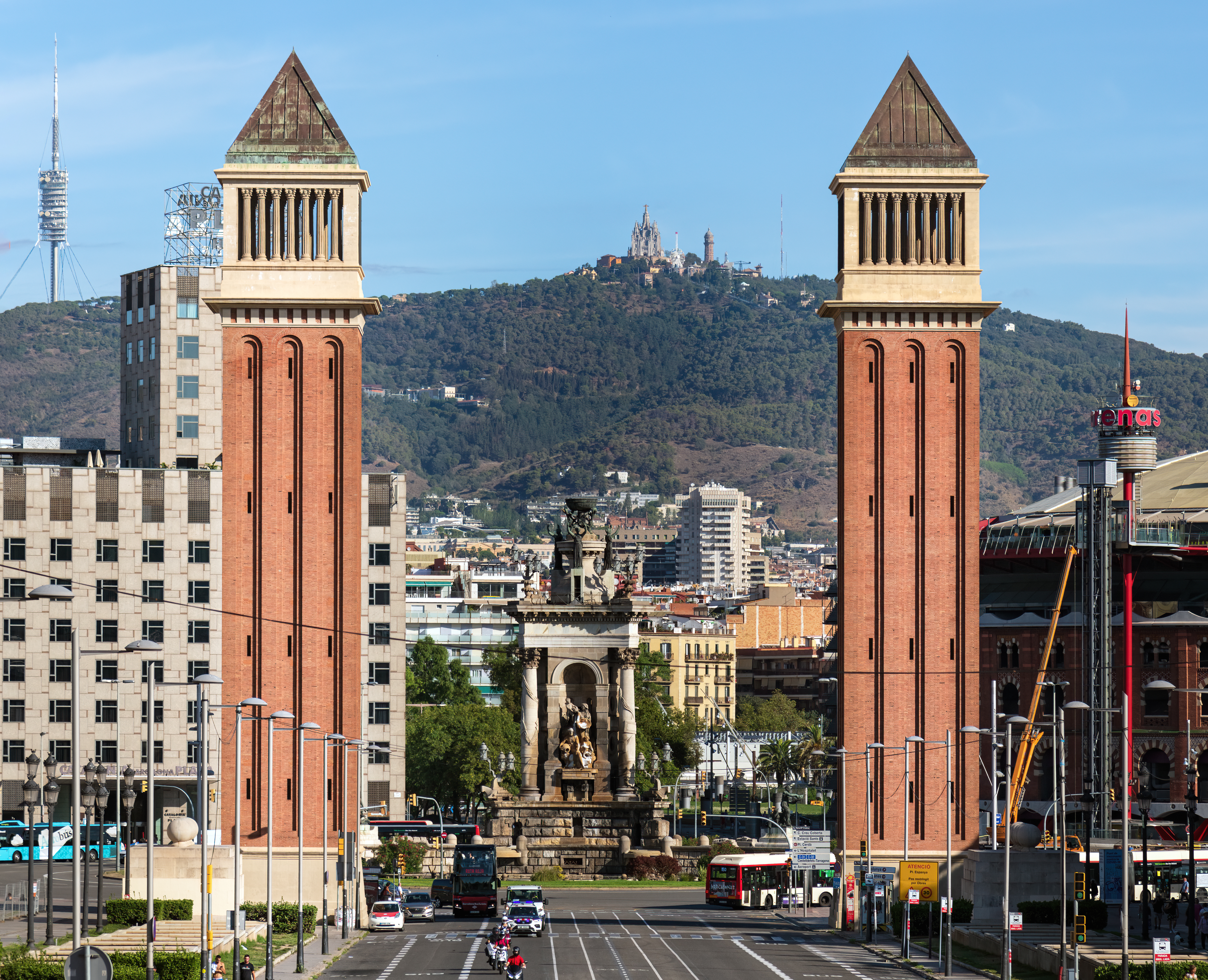
The Venetian towers, and Tibidabo

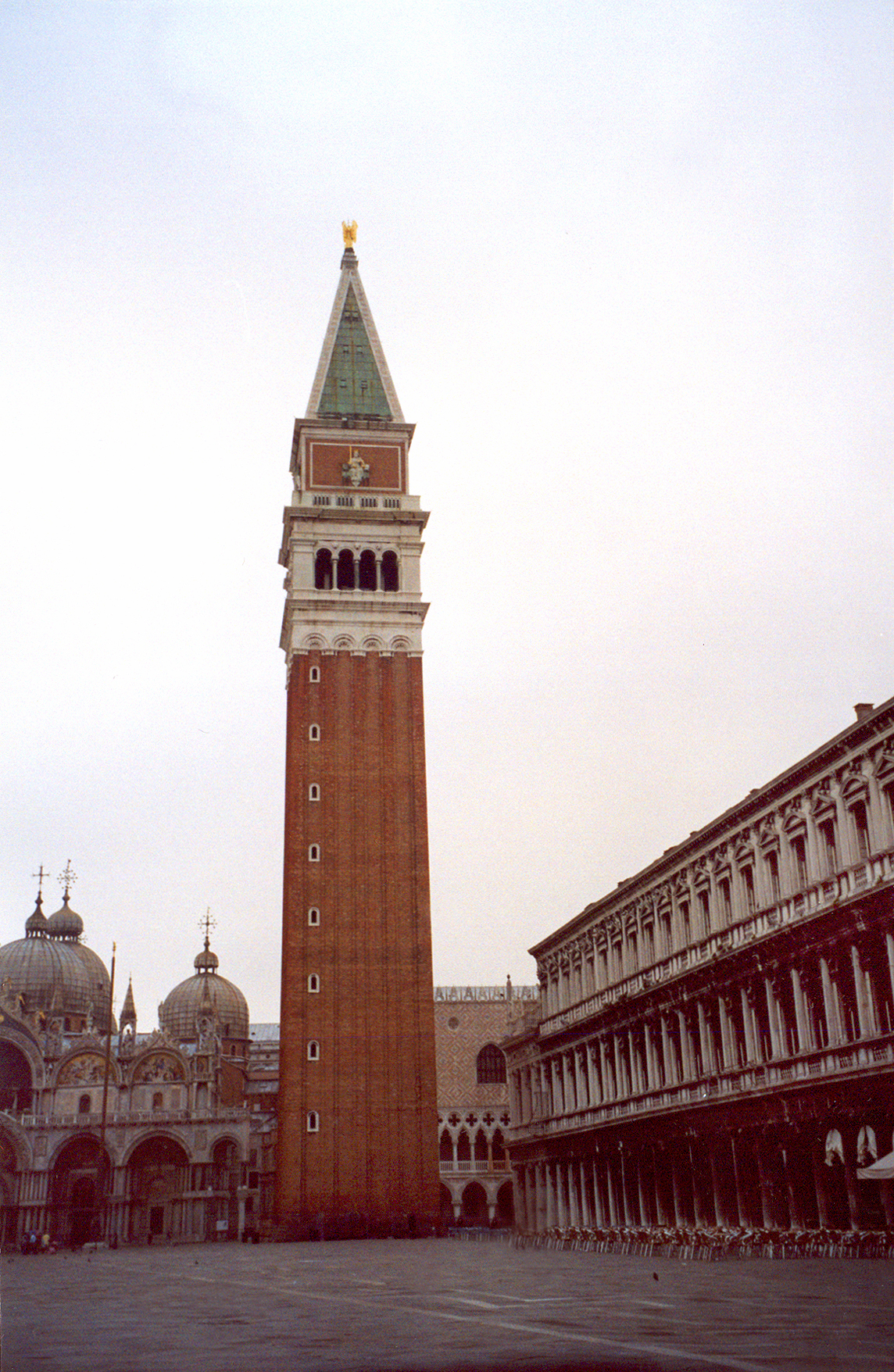
St. Mark's Campanile in Venice

The Venetian Towers (in Catalan: Torres Venecianes) is the popular name for a pair of towers on Avinguda de la Reina Maria Cristina at its junction with Plaça d'Espanya in Barcelona, Catalonia, Spain. There is one tower on either side of the street.

The towers are 47 m (154 ft) high, with a 7.2-metre (24 ft) square cross-section. The bottom section of each is built of artificial stone, the main section of red brick, and the top section is a colonnaded viewing gallery built of artificial stone, and topped by a pyramidal copper roof. They were modelled on the campanile of St. Mark's Basilica in Venice.

They were originally envisaged in Léon Jaussely's city expansion plan of 1907, and designed by architect Ramon Reventós and built in the period 1927 to 1929, as part of the redevelopment of the area for the 1929 Barcelona International Exposition. Reventós was also involved in a number of other projects featured in the exhibition, such as the Greek Theatre (Teatre Grec), the Spanish Village (Poble Espanyol), and the buildings of the Montjuïc Funicular on the nearby hill of Montjuïc.

They serve an ornamental function, to mark the entrance to the exhibition district, now known as Fira de Barcelona, and the start of the grand avenue leading up to the Palau Nacional on Montjuïc, which houses the National Art Museum of Catalonia. Originally, the towers were open to the public, who could climb the internal stairs to the viewing galleries, but they are now normally closed. In later years, the western tower housed equipment for controlling the illumination of the Magic Fountain of Montjuïc, 350m away at the far end of Avinguda Maria Cristina, and the gallery of the eastern tower housed sirens for signalling possible emergencies; the disused equipment was removed during the 2013/14 restoration work.

The towers are registered as protected structures by Barcelona city council, with a protection level of B:B, a structure of local interest.

Following restoration work, the towers opened to the public for the first time since 1929, for a two-day period during October 2014.

== Repairs ==
The towers had been built using cheap materials, which was typical of the noucentisme architectural style of the time, and was justified by the expected temporary nature of the towers which were planned to be demolished after the end of the exposition. Subsequent repair and restoration projects have been necessary to maintain and improve the structures.

In 1984/85, repair work was carried out on the towers, which included replacing the roofs which were originally of slate.

In 2009, a survey detected defects in the stonework in both towers, and resulted in netting being wrapped around the viewing galleries to catch any falling debris.

During September 2013, the towers started undergoing extensive restoration work costing €472,000. The work was expected to be completed in January 2014, and it enabled the removal of the netting which had previously been put in place.
