= Castellar del Riu =

- Municipality
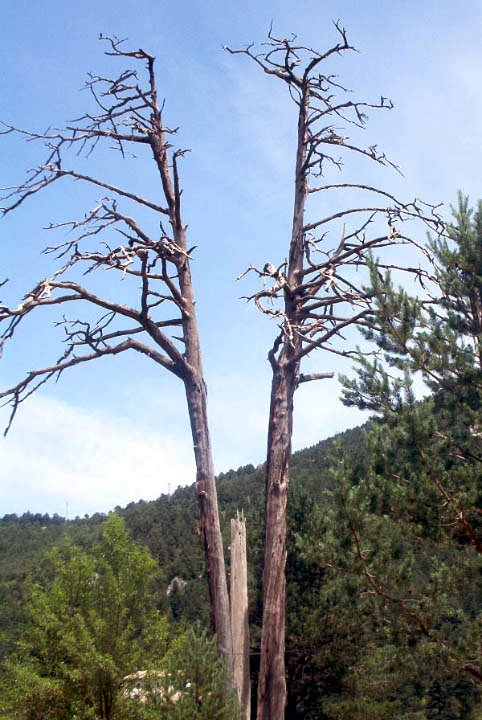
- Pi de les tres branques, considered a symbol of the united Catalan Countries

- Coat of arms

- Location in Berguedà

- Location in Catalonia Castellar del Riu (Spain)
- Coordinates: 42°07′59″N 1°42′36″E
- Country: Spain
- Community: Catalonia
- Province: Barcelona
- Comarca: Berguedà

Government
  - Mayor: Adrià Solé Giralt (2015) (CiU)

Area
  - Total: 32.7 km^{2} (12.6 sq mi)
- Elevation: 1,234 m (4,049 ft)

Population (2025-01-01)
  - Total: 151
  - Density: 4.62/km^{2} (12.0/sq mi)
- Demonym: Castellanenc
- Website: castellardelriu.cat

Castellar del Riu (Catalan pronunciation: [kəstəˈʎa ðəl ˈriw]) is a municipality in the comarca of Berguedà, Catalonia, northern Spain. The municipal government is located at Llinars, which is not a village but just a few municipal buildings including a small sports centre.

== Economy ==
The municipality's economy is principally centered on agriculture, and in particular dryland farming and animal husbandry. There is also small-scale tourism in the municipality, to the Pi de les Tres Branques (a monumental tree which is a popular venue for Catalan nationalist gatherings), and especially the ski station of Rasos de Peguera.
