= Avinguda de la Reina Maria Cristina =

Street in Barcelona, Spain

Coordinates: 41.3729°N 2.1506°E

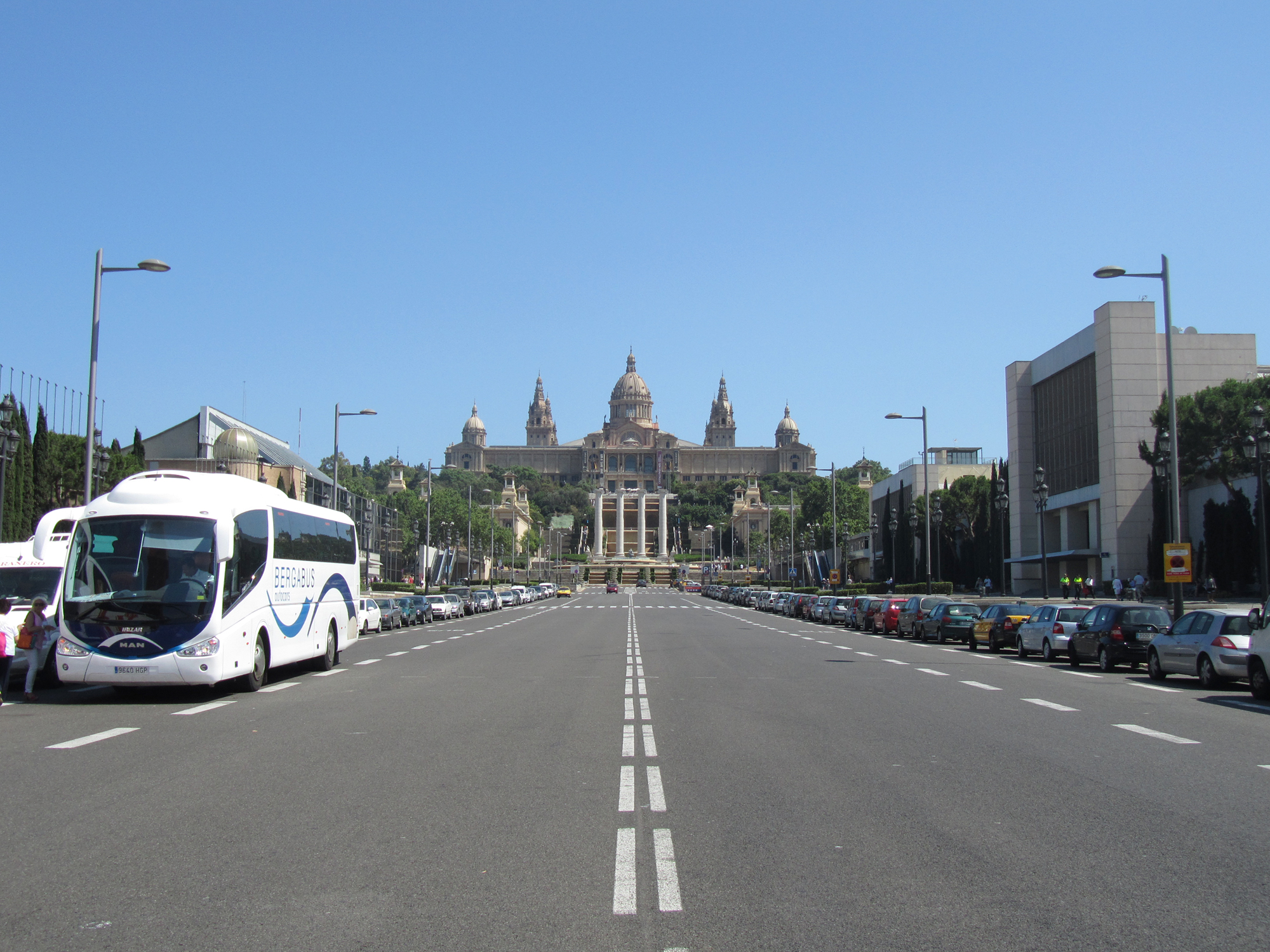
The avenue on a summer day with MNAC in the background.

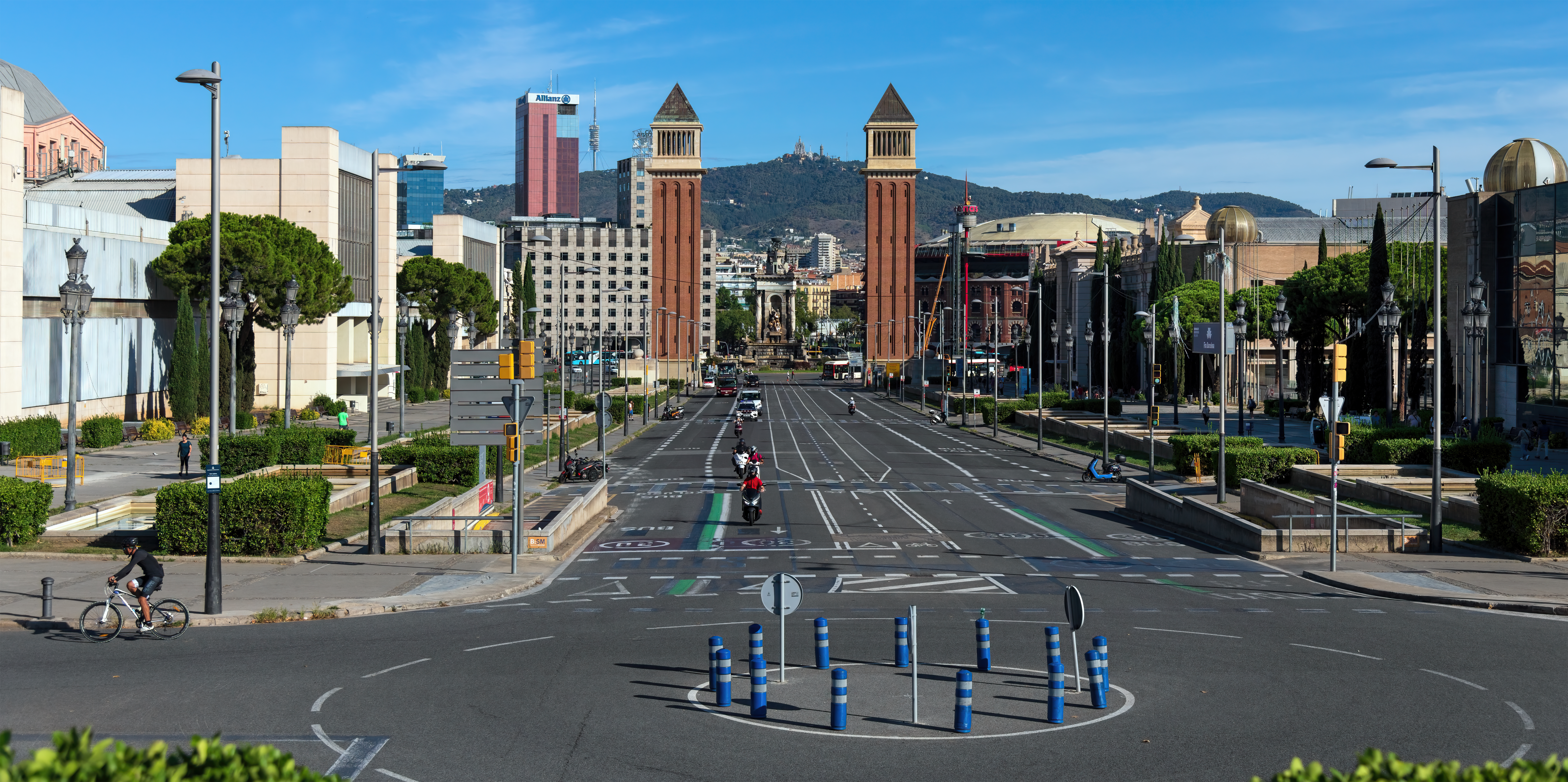
View towards Plaça d'Espanya

Avinguda de la Reina Maria Cristina (Catalan pronunciation: [əβiŋˈɡuðə ðə lə ˈrejnə məˈɾi.ə kɾisˈtinə]) is an avenue in the Sants-Montjuïc district of Barcelona linking Plaça d'Espanya with Museu Nacional d'Art de Catalunya on Montjuïc hill. It is named after Maria Christina of the Two Sicilies, queen consort and regent of Spain.

Part of the Fira de Barcelona is based here, with a number of yearly trade, technology and fashion fairs and festivals being held in this location. It's also the starting point of the Barcelona Marathon.

The twin Venetian Towers are a major landmark at the junction of this avenue with Plaça d'Espanya.

== Transportation ==
- Barcelona Metro – Espanya (TMB L1, L3, FGC L8)
- TMB bus line L97 (Barcelona Pl. Reina Maria Cristina – Castelldefels Bellamar)

== See also ==
- Urban planning of Barcelona
