= Parc de Joan Miró =

Park in Barcelona

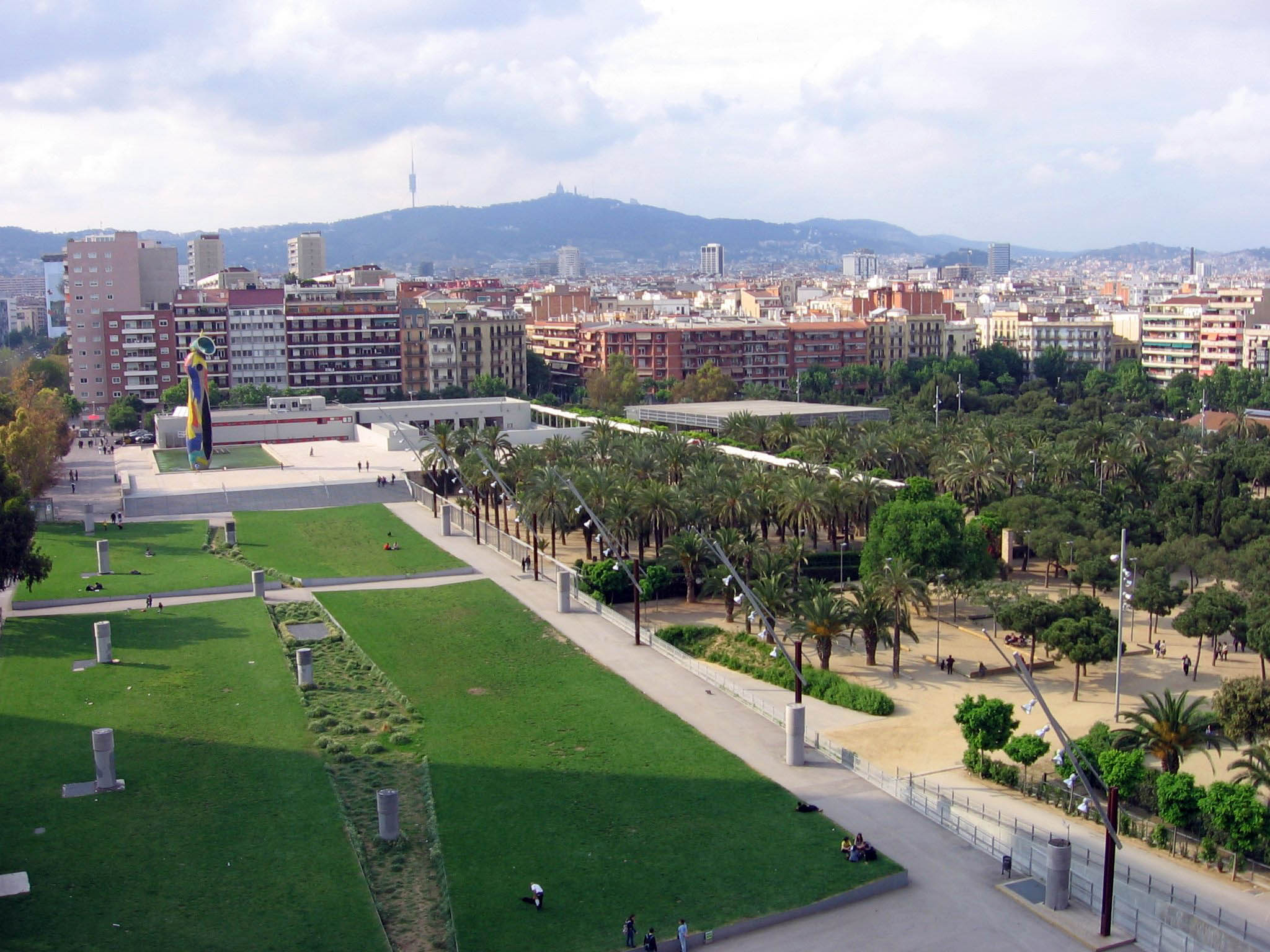
- Parc de Joan Miró.

- Location within Barcelona
- Location: Barcelona, Catalonia, Spain
- Coordinates: 41°22′40″N 2°08′54″E
- Area: 471 hectares (1,160 acres)
- Established: 1983
- Operator: City Council of Barcelona

The Parc de Joan Miró (Catalan: [ˈpaɾɡ də ʒuˈam miˈɾo]; "Joan Miró Park") is a park located in the Eixample of Barcelona, near the Plaça d'Espanya, from which it is separated by the Les Arenes bullring (which is now a shopping center). The name of the park is in recognition of the surrealist painter Joan Miró.

== History ==
It was formerly known as Parc de l'Escorxador ("Slaughterhouse Park"), because the old municipal slaughterhouse was located on its land. The project was the work of architects Antoni Solanas, Màrius Quintana, Beth Galí and Andreu Arriola, and was inaugurated on May 12, 1983. In 2006, a remodeling was carried out by Beth Galí, Jaume Benavent, Andrés Rodríguez and Rüdiger Würth, in which an underground parking lot and water tank were built, and the roof was adapted as a green area. The most prominent element of the park is the sculpture by Joan Miró, titled Dona i Ocell (Woman and Bird).

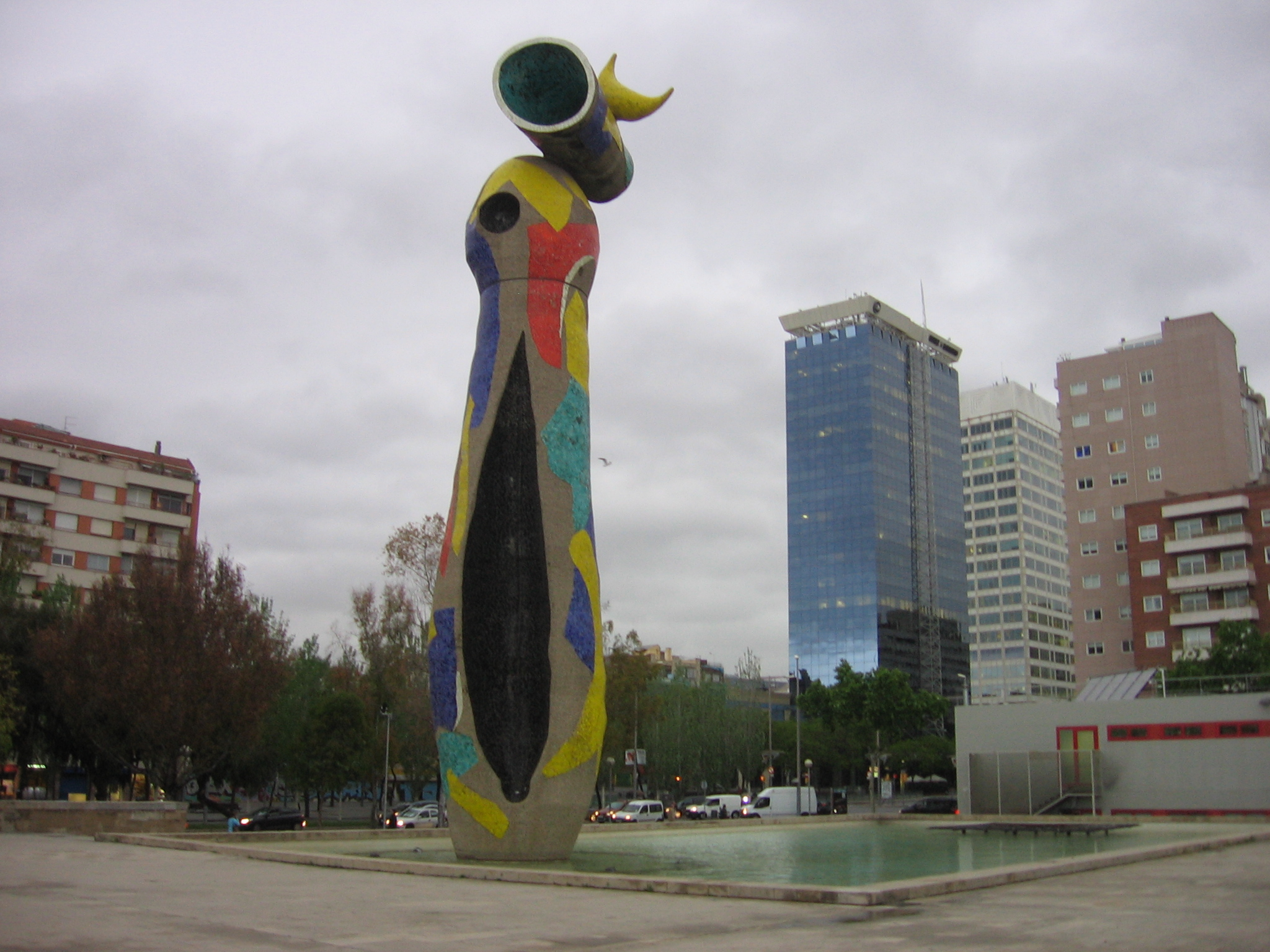
Dona i Ocell, by Joan Miró
