= Miró Wall =

Mural by Joan Miró

Coordinates: 49°28′47.2″N 8°26′38.7″E

- Artists: Joan Miró and Joan Gardy Artigas
- Year: 1979
- Type: Mural
- Dimensions: 10 m × 55 m (33 ft × 180 ft)
- Location: Wilhelm Hack Museum, Ludwigshafen

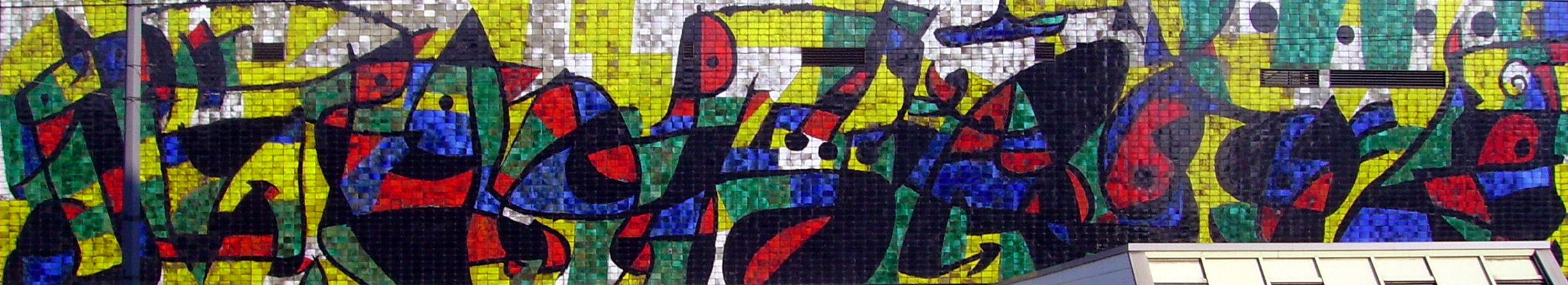
The mural on the side of Wilhelm Hack Museum

The Miró Wall is a ceramic tiled wall designed by Spanish artist Joan Miró for the Wilhelm Hack Museum in Ludwigshafen, Germany. The wall, which comprises 7,200 tiles, is 55 metres (180 ft) wide and 10 metres (33 ft) high.

== Design ==
The elements in the mural are colorful and fanciful creatures. The 55 by 10 metres (180 ft × 33 ft) mural was produced by Joan Gardy Artigas. He created the 7,200 tiles based on a design by Miró involving surreal figures and animals. Artigas had to work from an image which Miró had created at one-tenth the scale of the finished wall. Using that model, he marked out each section on an individual 20 by 36 centimetres (7.9 in × 14.2 in) tile. The artwork was completed in 1979 and includes the signatures of both artists at the bottom, left-hand corner. Miró's signature is undated; Artigas' signature is dated 1979.

Artigas was a second generation surrealist. His father had been a ceramicist for both Picasso and Miró. When Artigas' father wanted to retire, Miró brought the younger Artigas back from exile in France, where he had been avoiding the Spanish Francoist regime. Artigas junior worked with Miró for twenty years creating other similarly sized murals for UNESCO, IBM and the Palacio de Exposiciones y Congresos in Madrid.

The mural was opened at the same time as the new museum was built. It was in the town's market place and had been constructed to hold the art collection of the Cologne businessman, Wilhelm Hack, whose collection had been given to Ludwigshafen. Hack saw the new museum before he died in 1985.

== Construction ==
The tiles were fired in Gallifa, a village near Barcelona. They had to be transported 1,200 kilometres (750 mi) to the museum. Because of the terrain, they were placed four to a box so they could be carried down the mountain by mule. After that, the tiles were transported by lorry and train to complete the journey from Catalonia (Spain) to south western Germany. The wall has become discoloured from pollution and has not been cleaned because of the high cost.

Additional photos

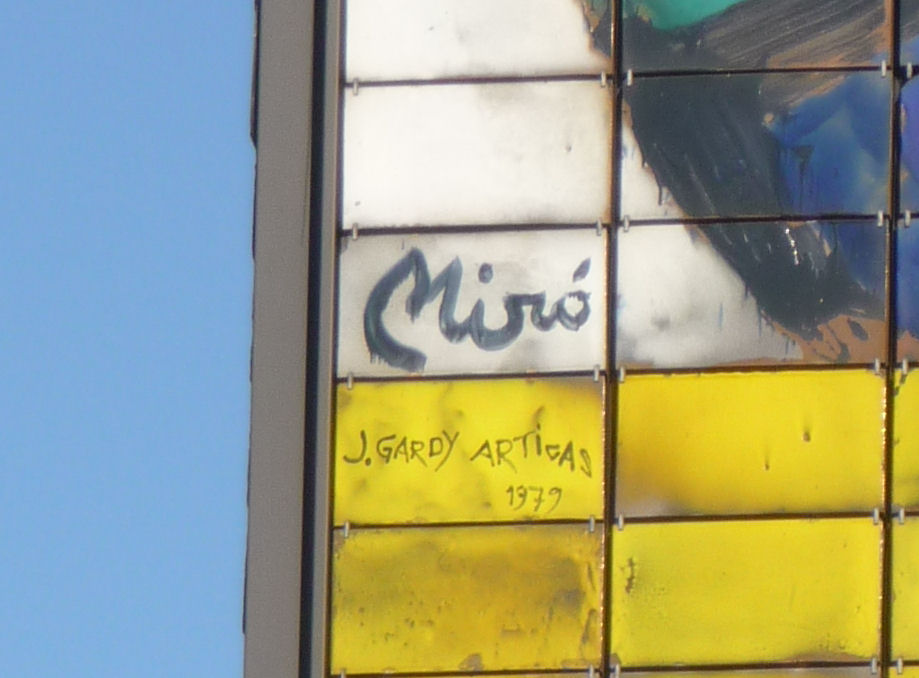
The artists' signatures

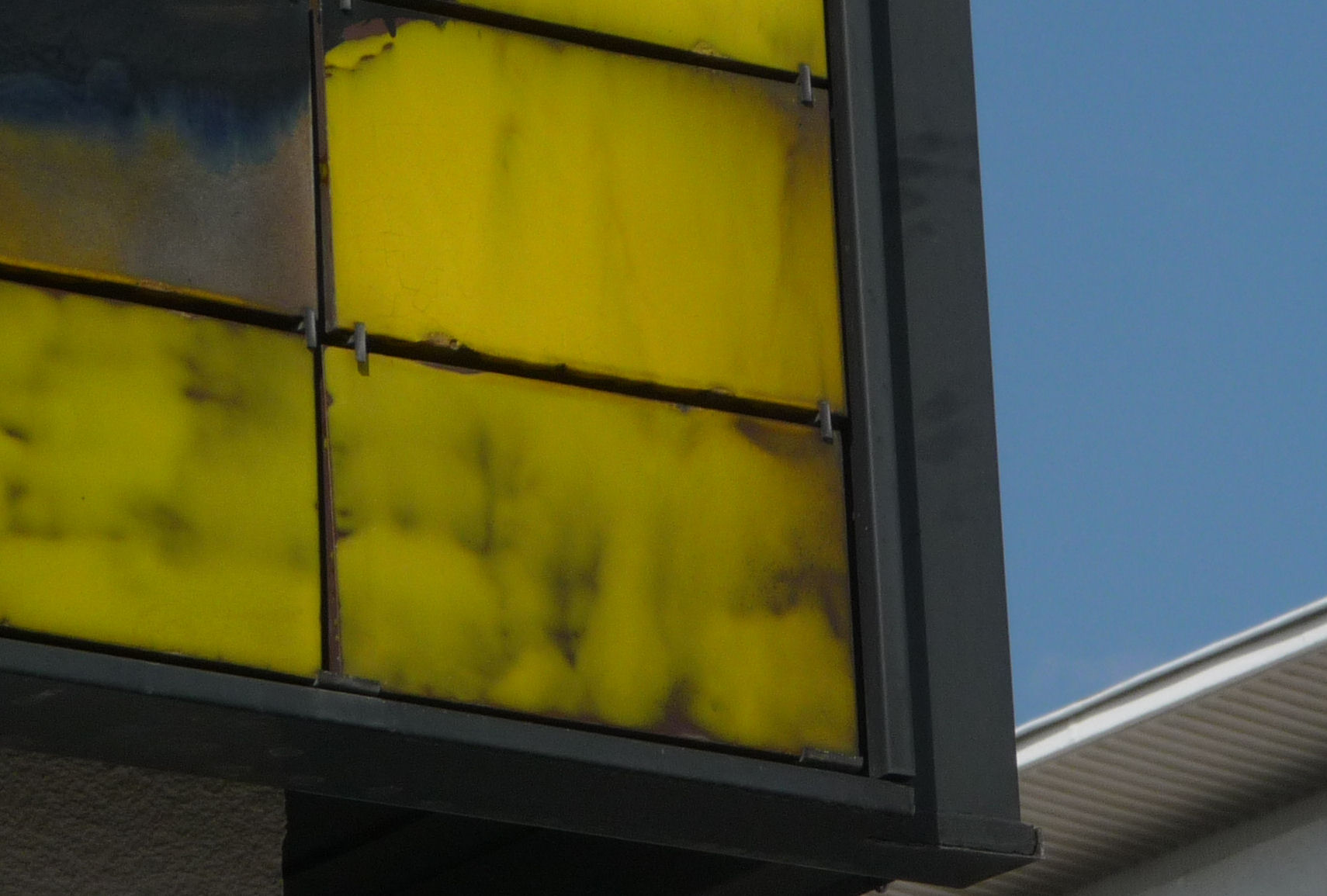
The tiles and their frame

== Sources ==
- Marlis Jonas (Photos), Richard W. Gassen (text): city art space. Public Art in Ludwigshafen am Rhein. Kehrer Verlag, Heidelberg 2007, ISBN 978-3-936636-17-8 .
