= Joan Gardy Artigas =

Catalan ceramist and sculptor

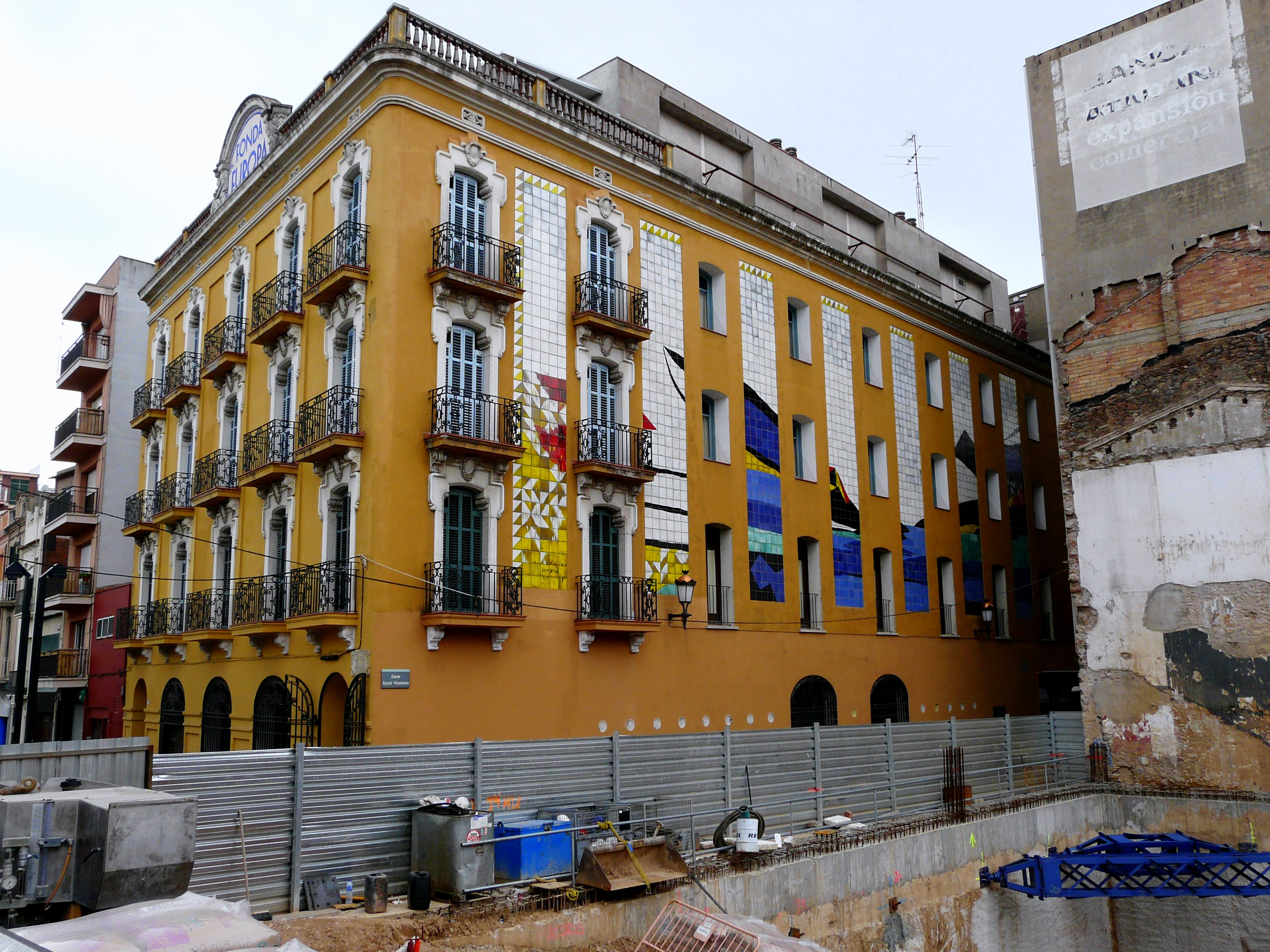
- Fonda Europa, a building decorated by Joan Gardy Artigas in Granollers
- Born: 18 June 1938 (age 87); Boulogne-Billancourt, France
- Occupation: Artist
- Known for: Ceramist and collaborator with Joan Miró

Joan Gardy Artigas (born 18 June 1938) is a Spanish ceramist and sculptor. He and his likewise ceramist father were close collaborators with Joan Miró.

== Life ==
Artigas was born on 18 June 1938 in Boulogne-Billancourt (near Paris) and his father was Josep Llorens Artigas who worked closely with Miró and Pablo Picasso. Artigas was able to work for Miró, whilst still a teenager, because of his father's relationship with Miró. Artigas trained at the Ecole des Beaux Arts in Paris where he met the Swiss sculptor Alberto Giacometti. Artigas established his own studio where at Giacometti's suggestion he concentrated on sculpture. Artigas had some success and supplied his expertise to the cubists Georges Braque and Marc Chagall.

When Artigas created the 7,200 tiles for the Miró Wall he coloured the tiles based on an image which Miró had created. Using that scale model, he marked out each section on an individual 20 by 36 centimetres (7.9 in × 14.2 in) tile. The artwork includes the signatures of both artists. Artigas' signature is dated 1979.

Artigas was later called to return to assisting Miró when his father decided to retire. His father had worked with Miró for twenty years creating large murals including examples for UNESCO, IBM and the Palacio de Exposiciones y Congresos in Madrid. Artigas worked with Miró on, Dona i Ocell, one of his last large works which was covered in broken tiles by Artigas. In this case the tiles remind the viewer of Gaudi's work.

In 1982 Antoni Tàpies won the Gold Medal of Catalonia for a mosaic in the Plaça de Catalunya in Sant Boi de Llobregat. Artigas had constructed the ceramics for this prize winning exhibit. Artigas continued his own art and he was awarded his first solo exhibition in America in 1982. He has been a visiting artist at two American universities and he has founded a foundation to celebrate his father's work. Gardy-Artigas serves on the board of the foundation Fundació Joan Miró in Barcelona.
