= Plaça d'Espanya, Barcelona =

Square in Barcelona, Spain

Coordinates: 41.375°N 2.149°E

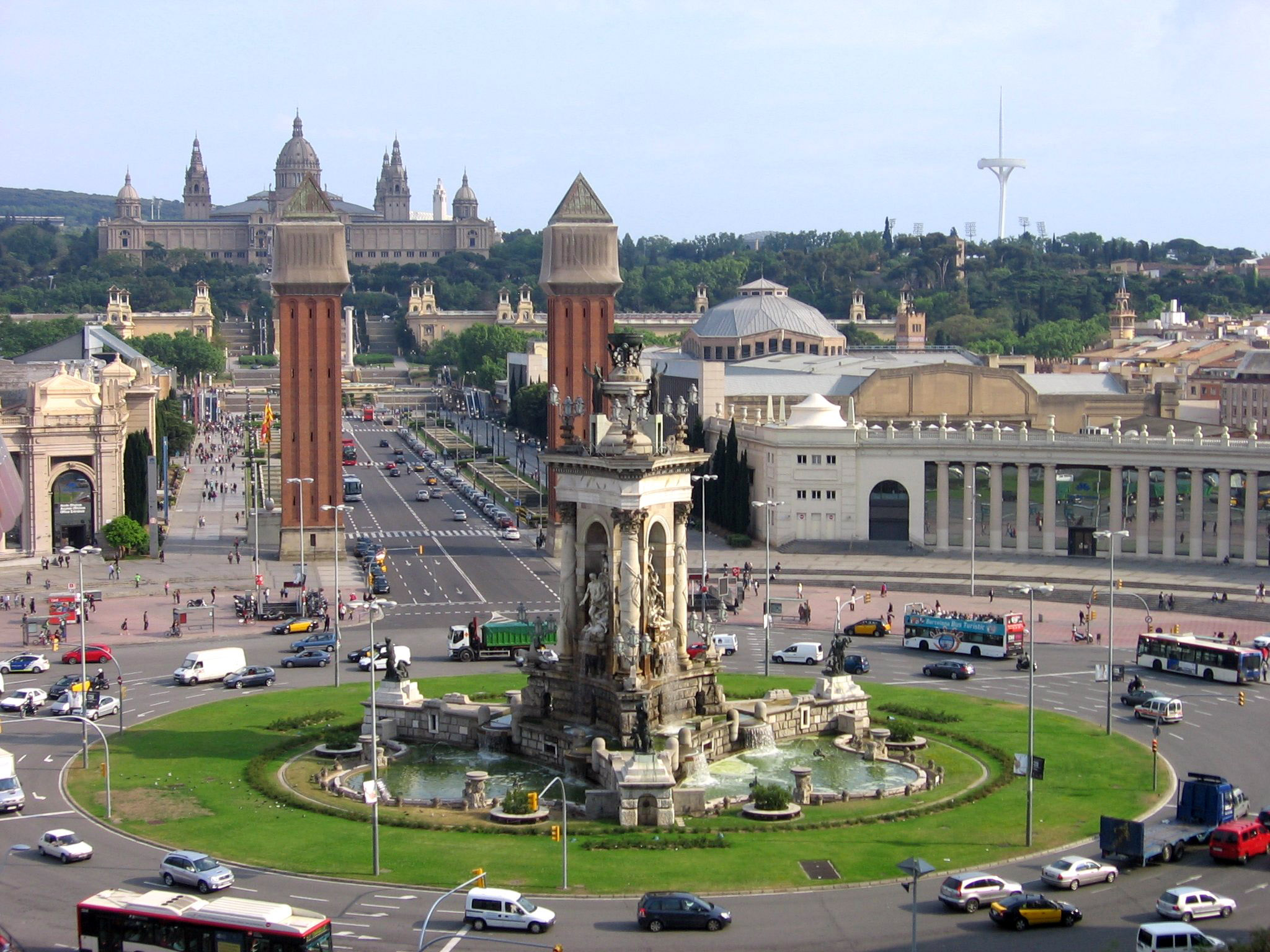
Plaça d'Espanya

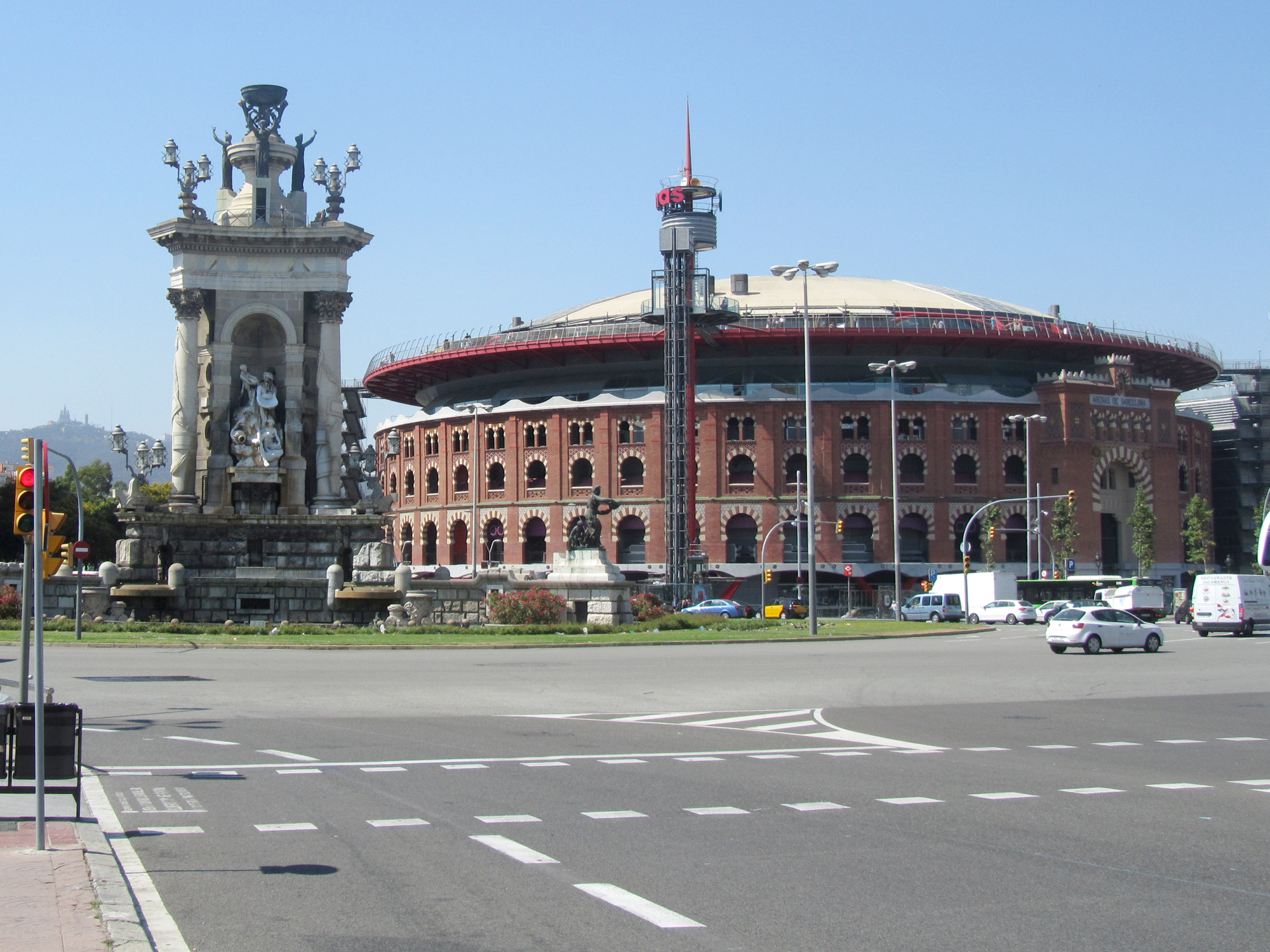
Plaça d'Espanya with the Plaza de toros de las Arenas

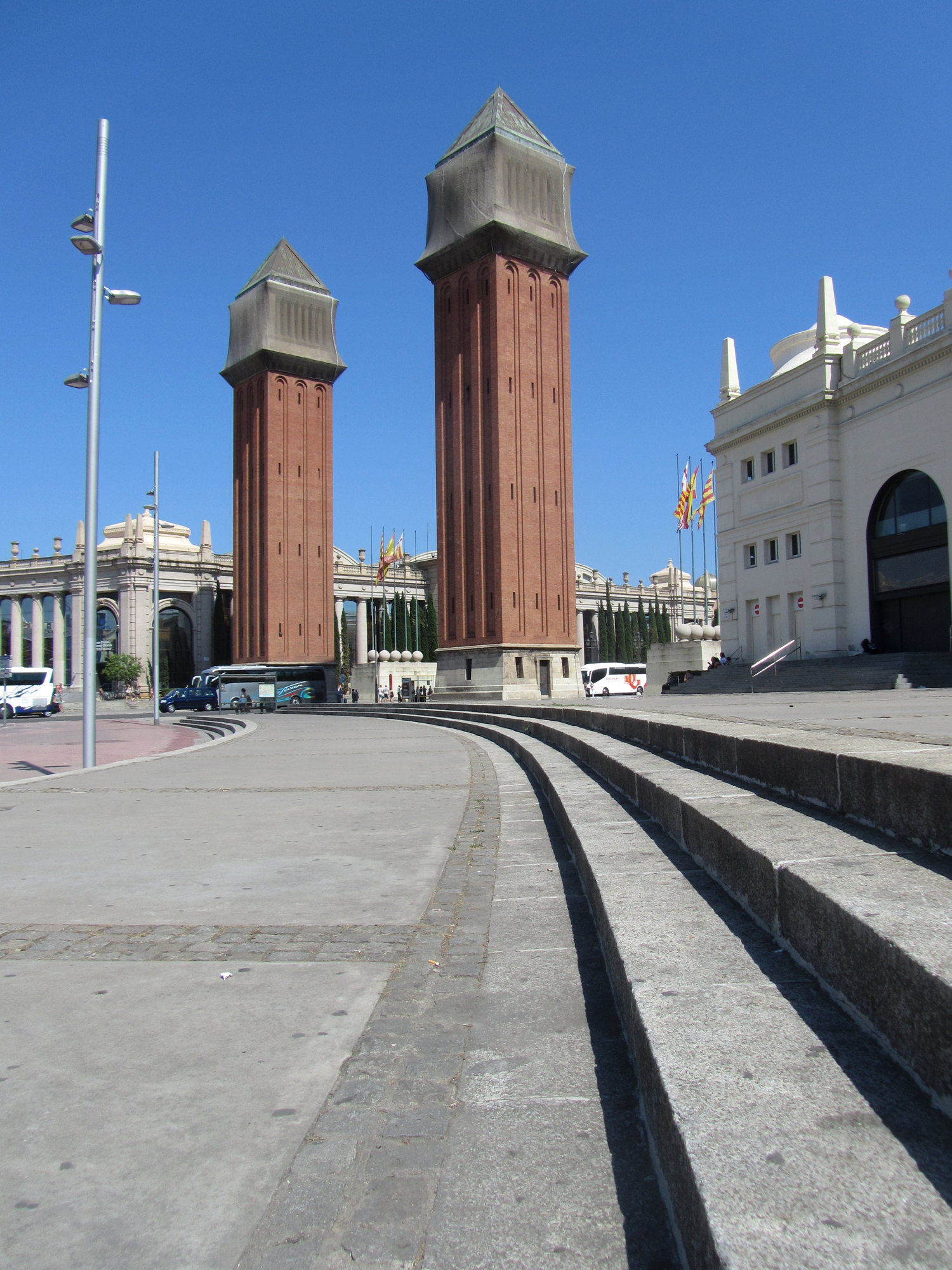
The Venetian towers

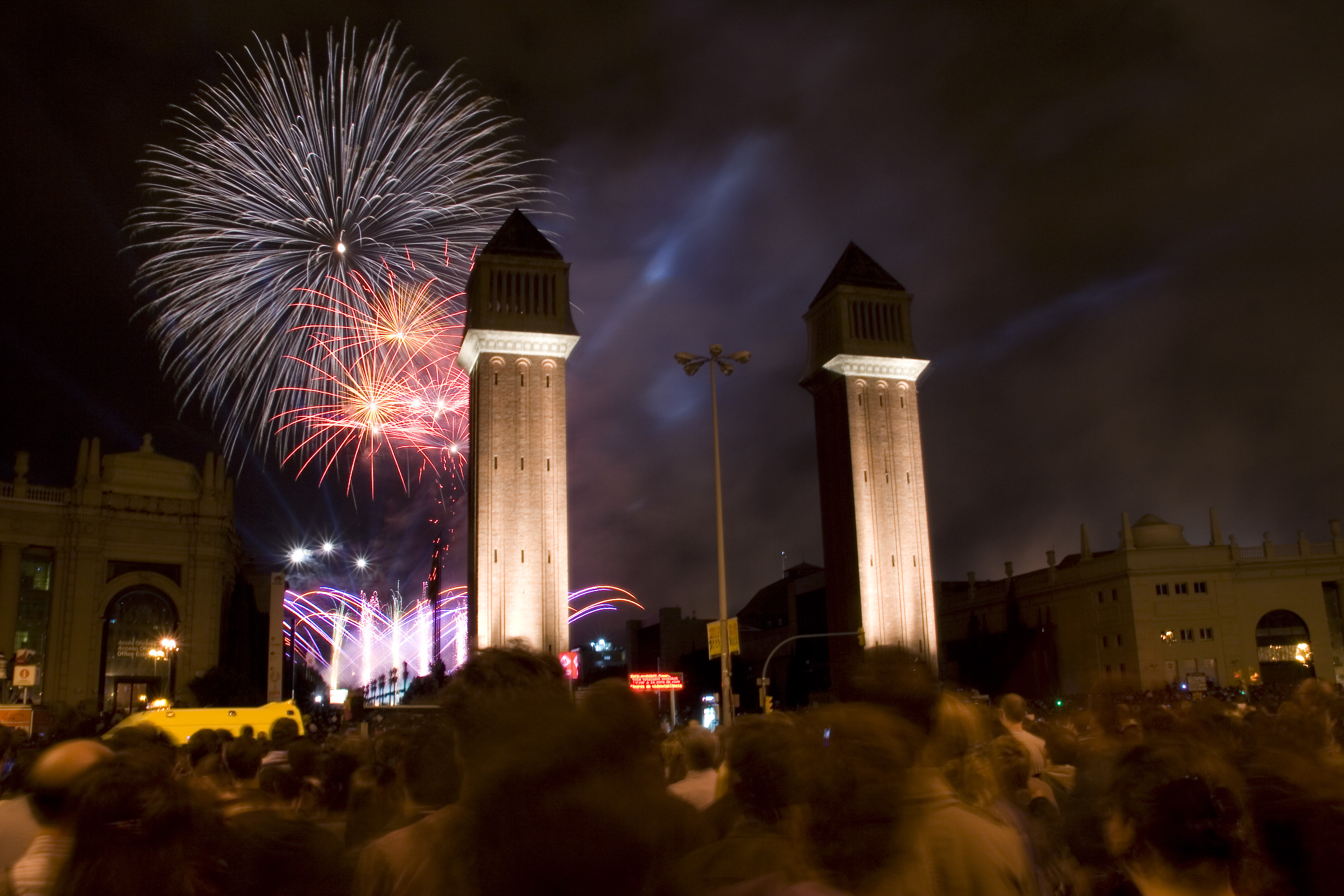
Celebrating La Merce with a great fireworks show.

Plaça d'Espanya (Catalan pronunciation: [ˈplasə ðəsˈpaɲə]; English: Plaza of Spain) is one of Barcelona's most important squares, built on the occasion of the 1929 Barcelona International Exposition, held at the foot of Montjuïc, in the Sants-Montjuïc district.

== Features ==
One of the city's biggest squares, it is the junction of several major thoroughfares: Gran Via de les Corts Catalanes, Avinguda del Paral·lel, Carrer de la Creu Coberta and Carrer de Tarragona, and leads to the Palau Nacional through Avinguda de la Reina Maria Cristina, which houses one of Catalonia's finest museums, the Museu Nacional d'Art de Catalunya (MNAC). It was designed by Josep Amargós. The fountain at the centre of the square was designed by Josep Maria Jujol, a collaborator of Antoni Gaudí, while Miquel Blay designed the statues. The buildings were designed by Nicolau Maria Rubió i Tudurí.

- Venetian Towers - they are 47 m (154 ft) tall and lead the way to the MNAC via Avinguda de la Reina Maria Cristina, an avenue commonly used to host trade fairs.
- Fira de Barcelona
- Parc de Joan Miró - previously known as Parc de l'Escorxador (Abattoir Park), it is nowadays named after the Catalan painter Joan Miró, whose 22-metre-tall statue Dona i Ocell (Woman and Bird) can be seen in one of its corners.
- Arenas de Barcelona, a bullring - It was built in 1900 in the Moorish Revival style and has been converted into a shopping center.

== History ==
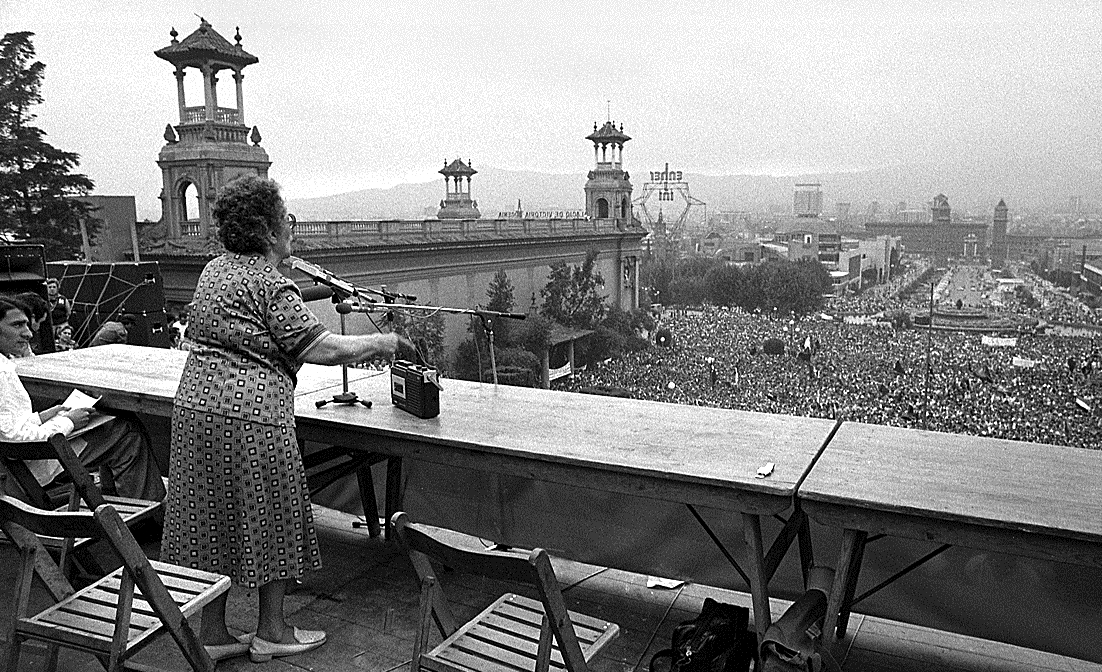
CNT-FAI demonstration in 1977 at Plaça d'Espanya

The square was built on a site that had been previously used for public hangings, until the creation of the now demolished Ciutadella fortress in 1715, where the gallows were moved. It was designed in 1915 and built in 1929 so that it could be ready to host the 1929 Universal Exposition. The square has been in public use since then. The square was used extensively during the Spanish transition to democracy.

== Transport ==
Plaça d'Espanya is also a major transport hub that serves most parts of the Metropolitan Area of Barcelona.

=== Metro ===
- Espanya (L1, L3, L8)

=== Bus ===
- Line 7 Diagonal Mar - Maria Cristina
- Line 9 Pl. Catalunya - Pg. Zona Franca
- Line 13 Mercat de St. Antoni - Can Clos
- Line 23 Pl. Espanya - Parc Logístic
- Line 27 Pl. Espanya - Roquetes
- Line 30 Pl. Espanya - Sarrià
- Line 34 Sarrià - Virrei Amat
- Line 36 Paral·lel - -Can Drago
- Line 37 Hospital Cínic - Zona Franca
- Line 43 Les Corts - Sant Adrià
- Line 46 Pl. Espanya - Aeroport
- Line 50 Montjuïc - Trinitat Nova
- Line 56 Collblanc - Besòs / Verneda
- Line 57 Barcelona (Pg. Marítim) - Cornellà (Estació busos)
- Line 61 Poble Sec - Parc de Montjuïc
- Line 68 Poble Sec - Parc de Montjuïc
- Line 79 Pl. Espanya - Av. Carrilet (M)
- Line 80 Barcelona (Pl. Espanya) - Gavà (Av. Joan Carles II)
- Line 81 Barcelona (Pl. Espanya) - Gavà (Av. Joan Carles II)
- Line 91 Rambles - Bordeta
- Line 153 Barcelona - Cornellà
- Line 157 Pg. Marítm - Sant Joan Despí
- Line 193 Pl. Espanya - C. Montjuïc

=== Night bus ===
- Line N0 Pl. Portal de la Pau - Pl. Portal de la Pau
- Line N1 Zona Franca (Mercabarna) - Pl. Catalunya - Roquetes (Aiguablava)
- Line N2 Hospitalet (Av. Carrilet) - Badalona (Via Augusta)
- Line N14 Barcelona (Rda. Universitat) - Castelldefels (Centre Vila)
- Line N15 Barcelona (Pl. Portal de la Pau) - Sant Joan Despí (Rbla. Josep Maria Jujol)
- Line N16 Barcelona (Rda. Universitat) - Castelldefels (Bellamar)
- Line N17 Pl. Catalunya - Aeroport

=== Train ===
==== Ferrocarrils de la Generalitat de Catalunya ====
Metro del Baix Llobregat

- R5/R50 Manresa-Baixador
- R6/R60 Igualada
- S3 Can Ros
- S4 Olesa de Montserrat
- S8 Martorell-Enllaç
- S9 Quatre Camins
- L8 Molí Nou

== See also ==
- Urban planning of Barcelona
