= Gallifa =

- Municipality
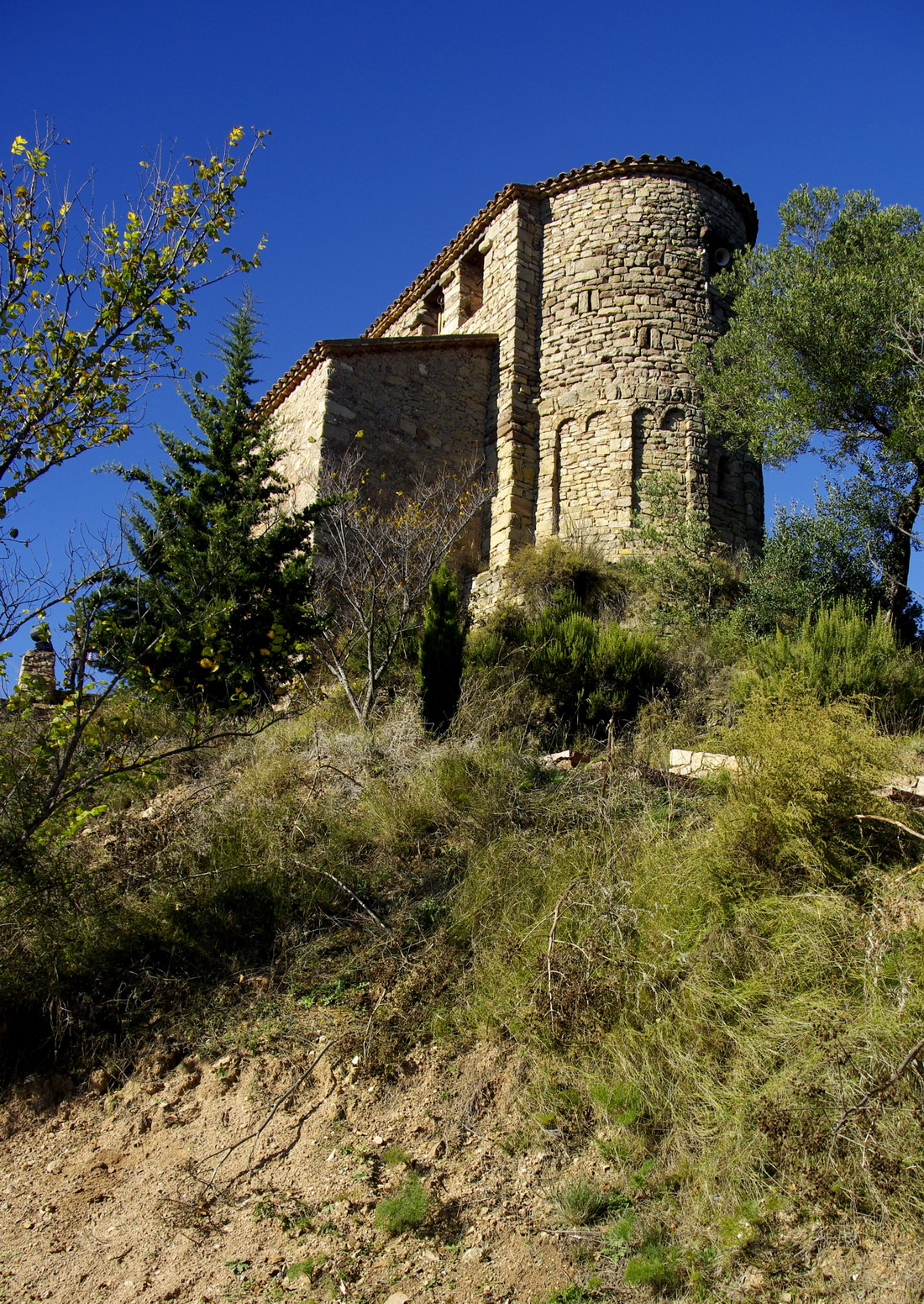
- The castle became a church

- Flag Coat of arms

- Location in Catalonia Gallifa (Catalonia) Gallifa (Spain)
- Coordinates: 41°41′39″N 2°6′56″E
- Country: Spain
- Autonomous community: Catalonia
- Province: Barcelona
- Comarca: Vallès Occidental

Government
  - Mayor: Mateu Comalrena de Sobregrau Esteve (2015)

Area
  - Total: 16.3 km^{2} (6.3 sq mi)
- Elevation: 502 m (1,647 ft)

Population (2025-01-01)
  - Total: 171
  - Density: 10.5/km^{2} (27.2/sq mi)
- Postal code: 08146
- Website: gallifa.cat

Gallifa (Catalan pronunciation: [gəˈʎifə]) is a municipality in the comarca of the Vallès Occidental in Catalonia, north-eastern Spain. It contains the Castle of Gallifa and was the location of the studio of ceramic artist Josep Llorens i Artigas and his son.

== Claim to fame ==
The Castle of Gallifa overlooks the village from a height of 600 metres.

In 1953 Joan Miró and Josep Llorens i Artigas worked at Artigas's studio in Gallifa. There they created "firestones" which they exhibited under their joint names, including in 1956 a joint exhibition in New York. The following year the two worked on a mural for the UNESCO headquarters and for the University of Harvard. The tiles that made up the two murals for the UNESCO building were created in Gallifa and Miro supervised their installation in Paris. The murals are called "The Wall of the Sun" and "The Wall of the Moon".

The tiles for Joan Miró's ceramic mural (the Miró Wall) were fired in Gallifa and they were then transported 1200 km to the Ludwigshafen museum in Germany. They were placed four to a box so that they could be moved down the mountain by mule. After that lorries and the train were used to complete the journey from Catalonia to south western Germany.
