= Pi de les Tres Branques =

Dead pine tree in the countryside in Catalonia, Spain

Pi de les tres branques
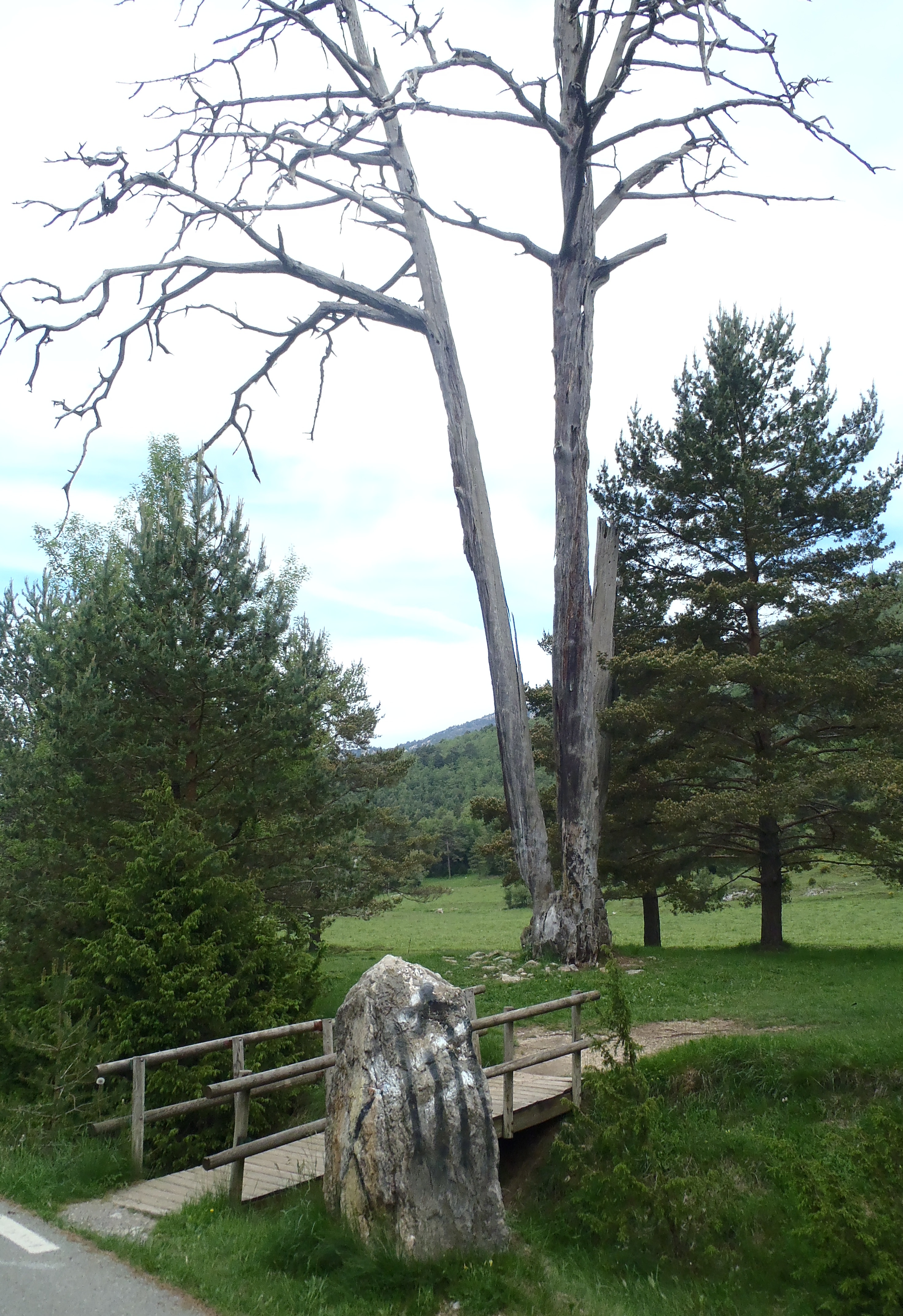
- Pi de les tres branques in 2012
- Interactive map of Pi de les tres branques
- Species: Scots pine (Pinus sylvestris)
- Location: Pla de Campllong, Castellar del Riu, Barcelona, Catalonia, Spain
- Coordinates: 42.110531°N 1.781891°E
- Website: official record

Pi de les tres branques (Catalan: [ˈpi ðə ləs ˈtɾɛz ˈβɾaŋkəs]; meaning "the three-branched pine") is a dead pine tree located in the countryside near the town of Berga in north-central Catalonia, Spain. It has long been regarded by some Catalan nationalists as representing the unity of the three "Catalan Countries" and is the site of regular political-cultural gatherings.

The tree has been dead since 1915 and is in poor structural condition, due in part to politically-motivated vandalism, but there is a very similar living tree a short distance away known as Pi jove de les tres branques ("the young three-branched pine"), which is regarded as its successor. Both are protected as "monumental trees" by the Catalan Generalitat.

== Location ==
The tree is a Scots pine (Pinus sylvestris), 25 metres (82 ft) tall, and as its name suggests, consists of three main branches or trunks rising from a common base. It is located in the centre of the Campllong plain, which measures about 2 kilometres (1.2 mi) by 500 metres (1,600 ft) and occupies the flat floor of a valley, surrounded by forested mountains of the Pre-Pyrenees, at an altitude of 1,294 metres (4,245 ft). To the south, separating the valley from Berga town, is the Serra de Queralt ridge, home to the Queralt Sanctuary religious complex, and to the north are the Rasos de Peguera mountains and ski resort. Berga is 9 kilometres (5.6 mi) away by road.

The tree previously dominated the valley's farmed and grazed land, due to its height and full foliage, and was visible from a long distance, as is shown in old photographs. However, much of the surrounding land has now been taken over by forest, and Pi de les Tres Branques now has many other trees in its vicinity, which, together with its current skeletal form, make it much less visible than before.

The valley is traversed by a minor road which terminates at the small settlement of Castellar del Riu at its western end. The road passes close by Pi de les Tres Branques, which is indicated by a signpost.

== History ==
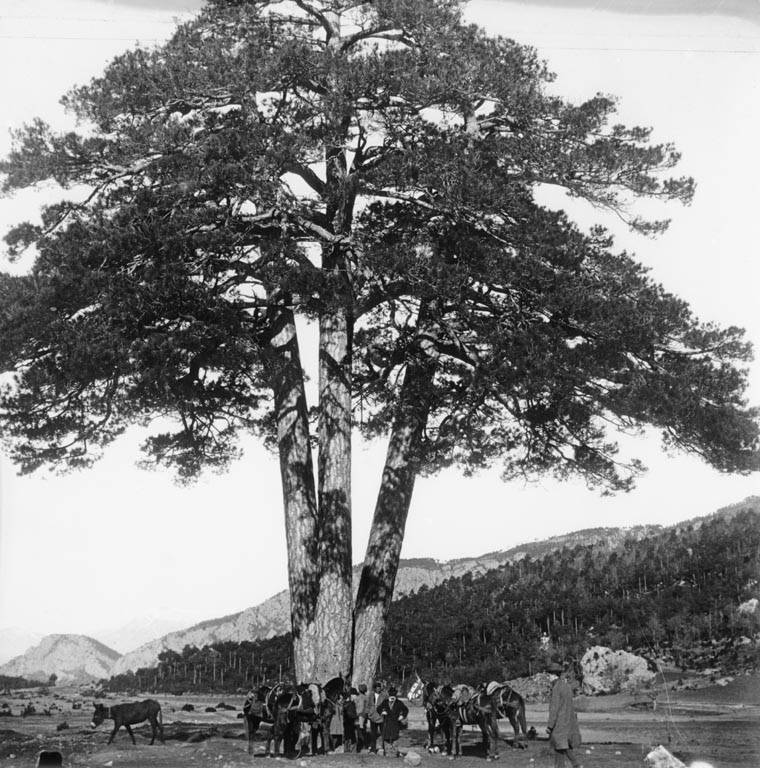
Pi de les Tres Branques in about 1905

=== Origin ===
Although legend places the tree much earlier, it has been estimated that Pi de les Tres Branques took root between 1630 and 1632, when the local farmhouse was built.

=== Cultural recognition ===
The tree had been traditionally celebrated as a symbol of the Holy Trinity, and it is still a venue for religious ceremonies. The first reference in extant records was in 1685, when a cartographer wrote that it was known as the Tree of the Trinity. It is also recorded that in 1746, the bishop of Solsona granted indulgences to those who prayed at the site.

In 1876, the landowner of the site, in a letter to a local magazine denying that he was planning to sell the tree for timber, pointed out that it also represented the revolutionary ideals of liberty, equality and fraternity.

The Catalan language cultural revival of the 19th century saw a great increase in Catalan literature and culture. In 1875, playwright Francesc Pelagi Briz published a play Lo Pi de las Tres Brancas, (Note: Spellings varied until the early-20th-century language reforms of Pompeu Fabra.) which is set in Berga and at the tree, and contains a passage suggesting that the tree was already a Catalan national symbol. (Note: From the play (translated): Guenyo: ... Look, see at the foot of the slope, on the plain, that gigantic pine with the half-bare stump. Tivat: Pi de les Tres Branques. Guenyo: You know its name? Tivat: Every good Catalan knows it; it's the household tree.) However, it was the 1888 poem "Lo Pi de les Tres Branques" by the poet Fr Jacint Verdaguer, published in his anthology Pàtria, which brought the tree to widespread attention, converting what was mainly a local religious symbol into a significant secular national symbol. In his poem, Jacint Verdaguer created the so-called 'legend' of the king-child King James I of Aragon who after being released from captivity in Narbonne (France) travelled with his retinue through Catalonia back to his seat at Monzón in Aragon, supposedly spending one of the nights sleeping under Pi de les Tres Branques, and it was there that he had an inspirational dream that he was destined to rule three kingdoms, represented by the three trunks of the tree, conquering the Balearic Islands and the Kingdom of Valencia from the Moors, which in fact he later achieved.

"Lo Pi de les Tres Branques"
(Jacint Verdaguer, 1888)

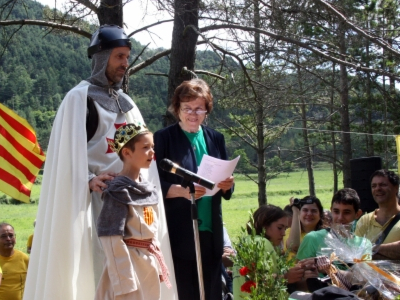
The poem being recited at the 2014 annual gathering

Preguem que sia aqueix Pi
l'arbre sagrat de la pàtria.

Per on baixa el Llobregat
dels Pirineus a la plana,
don Guillem de Mont-rodon
a trenc de dia davalla,
voltat de comtes i ducs
en ufanosa colcada.
De l'alta sella en l'arçó,
sobre arabesca gualdrapa,
seu en Jaume nostre rei;
no du més corona encara
que la de son cabell d'or
que algun àngel li ha deixada.
Lo tenia presoner
Narbona dins sa muralla:
al vencedor de Muret
Mont-rodon lo demanava;
Montfort no l'hi vol donar,
per gendre diu que se'l guarda.
Si serà son gendre o no
Mont-rodon ho diu al Papa;
la resposta que li fa
al vell Montfort no li agrada:
—Que torne el Rei a Aragó
i als Pirineus la seva àliga.—

Catalunya, aixeca el front,
doble sol avui t'aguaita,
lo sol que et surt a Orient
i el que t'ix a tramuntana.
Lo que et surt al Pirineu
te vol donar una ullada,
mes ell, infant de sis anys,
no vol ésser vist encara,
ja el veuran a Lleida prou
davant la cort catalana.
Abans d'arribar a Berga
s'enfilen per la muntanya,
per entre Estela i Queralt
de Campllong envers la plana;
quan són al mig de Campllong
la nit fosca és arribada.

Lo Campllong té com un breç
dues serres per barana,
per coberta un bosc de pins
verds tot l'any com l'esmaragda.
Corona immensa de tots
és una hermosa Pinassa,
pinetells semblen los pins
entorn de llur sobirana,
geganta dels Pirineus
que per sang té rius de saba.
Com una torre és son tronc
que s'esbadia en tres branques
com tres titans rabassuts
que sobre els núvols s'abracen,
per sostenir en lo cel
una cúpula de rama
que fa ombra a tot lo pla
com una nova muntanya.

Don Jaume cau de genolls
i en son èxtasis exclama:
—Al Pare, Fill i Esperit
per tots los segles hosanna!
tres persones i un sol Déu
que aquí sa firma ha posada,
com en l'arbre de Mambré
on Abraham reposava.—
Fent la senyal de la creu
se recolza a la Pinassa,
i la son del paradís
a ses parpelles davalla.
Don Guillem de Mont-rodon,
que és son àngel de la guarda,
l'abriga amb son gran escut
on vermellegen les Barres.
Alça els ulls a l'Infinit
que obira en sa tenda blava
clavetejada d'estels
i al cim lluna minvanta.

En dolça contemplació
lo sorprèn lo bes de l'alba;
al bes de l'alba i al seu
don Jaume se desvetllava:
—He somniat que era gran
i d'un bell país monarca,
d'un bell país com aqueix
entre el mar i la muntanya.
Com eix Pi meravellós,
mon regne posà tres branques,
foren tres regnes en un,
ma corona els coronava.—
Esbrinant somni tan dolç
lo sol li dóna a la cara
i esporuguida a ponent
la mitja lluna s'amaga.
Lo somni del rei infant
lo vell templari l'acaba
en extàtica oració,
espill de visió més clara.
Veu Catalunya la gran
fer-se més gran i més ampla,
robant als moros València,
prenent-los l'Illa Daurada.
Unides veu a les tres
com les tres cordes d'una arpa,
les tres nimfes d'eixa mar,
d'aqueix jardí les tres Gràcies.
Mes al veure desvetllar
lo lligador d'eixa garba,
profeta, al Conqueridor
sols li diu eixa paraula:
—Preguem, que sols Déu és gran,
los homes són ombra vana;
preguem que sia aqueix Pi
l'arbre sagrat de la pàtria.—

We pray that this Pine will be
the sacred tree of the fatherland.

Where the Llobregat descends
from the Pyrenees to the plain,
Sir William of Mont-rodon
goes down at break of day,
surrounded by counts and dukes
in a pompous cavalcade.
On the pillion of the high saddle,
over an arabesque blanket,
sits James our king;
he wears no more crown
than that of his golden hair
that some angel has loaned him.
He was held prisoner
inside the walls of Narbonne:
to the victor of Muret
Mont-rodon asks for him back;
Montfort will not give him back,
saying he is growing up into a son-in-law.
Will he be a son-in-law or not
Mont-rodon asks the Pope;
the reply he gives him
does not please old Montfort:
—The King should return to Aragon
and his eagle to the Pyrenees.—

Catalonia, raise your brow,
a double sun watches over you today,
the sun which rises for you in the east
and the one that appears in the north.
The one that comes from the Pyrenees
wants to have a look at you,
but he, infant of six years,
does not want to be seen yet,
as they will see him full well at Lleida
before the Catalan court.
Before arriving at Berga
they climb through the mountains,
between Estela and Queralt
towards the plain of Campllong;
on reaching the middle of Campllong
the dark night has arrived.

Campllong has like a cradle
two ridges as a railing,
for cover a forest of pines
green all year like an emerald.
The biggest crown of all
is a beautiful Great Pine,
other trees look like mushrooms
around their overlord,
giantess of the Pyrenees
who has rivers of sap for blood.
Its trunk is like a tower
that splits into three branches
like three stout titans
embracing above the clouds,
to support in the sky
a dome of branches
casting a shadow over the whole plain
like a new mountain.

King James falls to his knees
and in his ecstasy exclaims:
—To the Father, Son and Spirit
through all the ages hosanna!
three persons and only one God
who has put his signature here,
like on the tree of Mamre
where Abraham rested.—
Making the sign of the cross
he rests against the Great Pine,
and the sleep of paradise
descends on his eyelids.
Sir William of Mont-rodon,
who is his guardian angel,
covers him with his big shield
where the Bars blaze red.
He raises his eyes to the Infinite
which he discerns in its blue canopy
studded with stars
and at the summit a waning moon.

In sweet contemplation
the kiss of dawn surprises him;
at dawn's kiss and his kiss
King James awakens:
—I dreamed that I was great
and monarch of a beautiful country,
of a beautiful country like this
between the sea and the mountain.
Like this wonderful Pine,
my kingdom had three branches,
they were three kingdoms in one,
my crown crowned them.—
Finding this dream so sweet
the sun shines on his face
and frightened at the west
the half-moon hides.
The dream of the infant king
is finished by the old Templar
in an ecstatic speech,
mirror of a clearer vision.
He sees the great Catalonia
make itself greater and bigger,
stealing Valencia from the Moors,
taking from them the Golden Island.
He sees all three united
like the three strings of a harp,
the three nymphs of that sea,
the three Graces of that garden.
But seeing awake
the binder of that sheaf,
a prophet, the Conqueror
says to him only these words:
—We pray, since only God is great,
men are a feeble shadow;
we pray that this Pine will be
the sacred tree of the fatherland.—

The previous year, Verdaguer had stayed a few days in the nearby Queralt Sanctuary and visited the tree. "Lo Pi de les Tres Branques" recounts the story of James and the tree's symbolism of the Trinity and the unity of the Catalan Countries, and expressed the wish that it be adopted as Catalonia's national tree. The poem has remained the tree's principal literary connection, regularly recited at gatherings there. It starts and ends with the often-quoted lines "Preguem que sia aqueix Pi / l'arbre sagrat de la pàtria." ("We pray that this Pine will be / the sacred tree of the fatherland.").

It is accepted that in fact Verdaguer invented the story of James's sojourn for his poem, since there is no record of it before then, and that the poem's popularity created the legend.

In 1901, when Verdaguer was presiding at the Floral Games, a traditional Catalan poetry contest, he coined the sobriquet "Guernica of Catalonia" for the tree, referring to the Tree of Guernica, an oak tree which symbolises Basque freedom. He also suggested the tree's trunks symbolised the three major awards of the contest: country, faith, and love.

In May 1901 the landowner transferred ownership of the tree to the Unió Catalanista, a grouping of various nationalist organisations, at their meeting in Terrassa, though the transaction was never legally registered. This new popularity coincided with the slow decay of the tree, which eventually died in 1915.

In 1987 the Catalan regional government listed the tree as a protected "monumental tree", one of the first three such trees (along with Pi Jove and Roure de Can Codorniu in Sant Sadurní d'Anoia). A silhouette of Pi de les Tres Branques (while it was alive) is now used by the government as a generic logo for monumental trees.

=== Damage and death ===
Before its death, Pi de les Tres Branques had been attacked several times, for economic and/or political reasons.

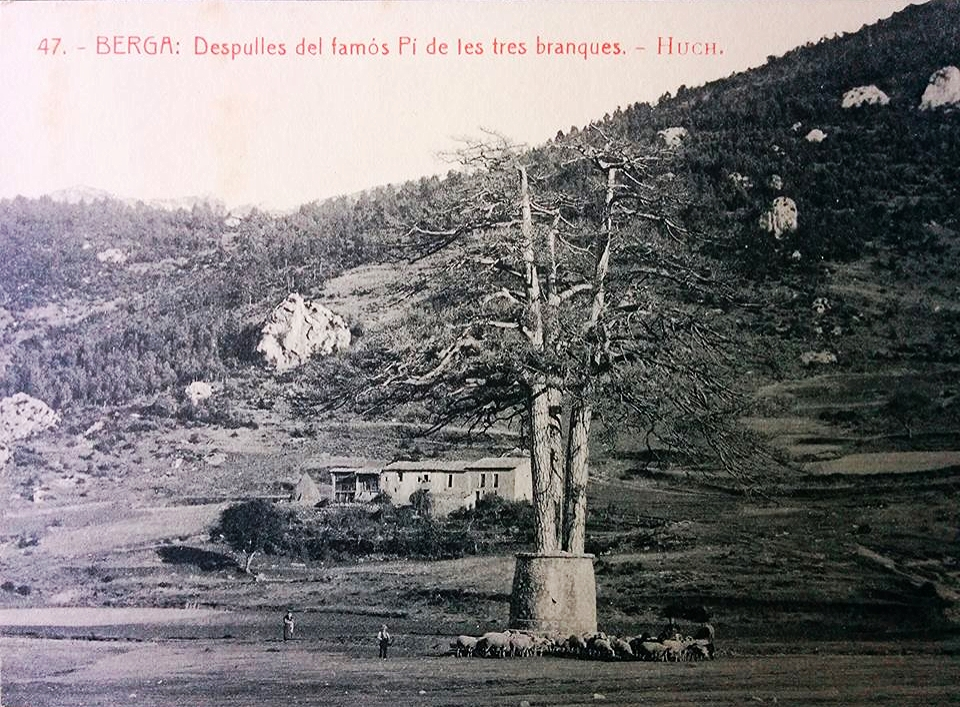
Pi de les Tres Branques, already dead, with the 1907 wall in place

In 1901, Jacint Verdaguer reported that a woodcutter had recently tried to cut down one of the trunks, causing it to lean out; damage from which the tree was unlikely to recover. It was also reported that around 1895, cuts had been made to tap the tree for resin, and a fire lit at its base to speed the process. This and other damage prompted the Catalanist Union to erect a high stone wall around the tree in 1907 to protect against further attacks, though it was suggested that the building work also contributed to the subsequent death of the tree. By 1915 the aforementioned wall had been demolished. (Note: as shown in the photograph in the cited source, also seen at File:Pi de les Tres Branques 1915.jpg)

In 1910, it was reported that the tree had lost its leaves, though others suggest a date of 1913, and it was completely dead by 1915. Scots pines have a natural lifespan of up to over 700 years, depending on the region.

Many years later, (Note: An anonymous internet forum comment says in the 1940s) the trunk that was damaged as reported by Verdaguer, was struck by lightning and the top half broke off. The remnant of that trunk is still supported by a small stone wall.

=== Later damage ===
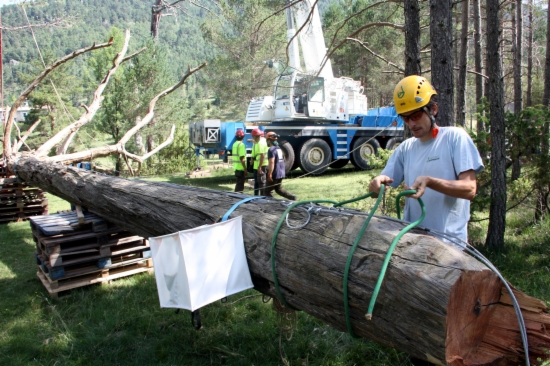
Preparing to restore the severed trunk, July 2015

Following its death, the tree has continued to be attacked many times by elements opposed to its political symbolism.

In 1939, after the end of the Civil War, supporters of the victorious Nationalist faction started an attempt to topple the tree, but were repelled by local people. It has also been subject to regular minor damage such as anti-Catalan graffiti.

However, the most serious deliberate damage happened during the night of 12/13 May 2014, when the tallest trunk was sawn off at its base with a chainsaw, by unknown perpetrators. Following the vandalism, the severed trunk was stored, and it was eventually decided to re-attach it with artificial supports, several steel straps connecting the trunk to the base; this work was carried out in early July 2015 at a cost of €35,000, shared by the Catalan government and the Barcelona provincial administration.

In January 2016, the tree was again attacked (along with Pi Jove) with a 10 cm chainsaw cut into one of the other trunks. This damage was quickly patched up with steel straps as before.

== Pi Jove ==
Pi Jove de les Tres Branques
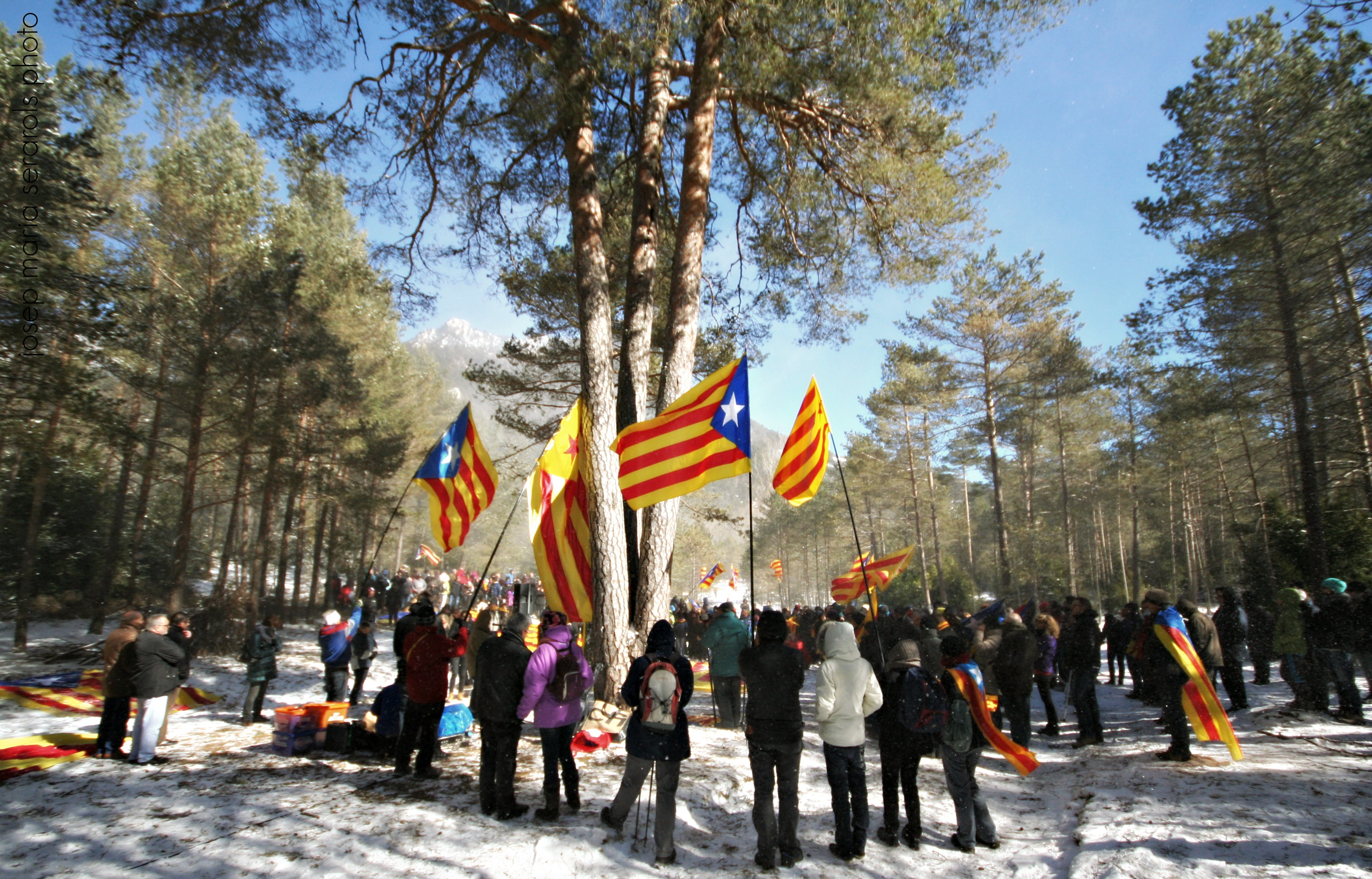
- Ceremony at Pi Jove, February 2015
- Interactive map of Pi Jove de les Tres Branques
- Species: Scots pine (Pinus sylvestris)
- Location: Pla de Campllong, Castellar del Riu, Berguedà, Catalonia, Spain
- Coordinates: 42.109286°N 1.779139°E
- Website: official record

Following the death of Pi de les Tres Branques, another three-branched pine 300 metres (980 ft) away had been adopted as its successor. Pi Jove de les Tres Branques, or Pi de les Tres Branques II, is also hundreds of years old, but smaller at 19 metres (62 ft) tall. Its similarities to the main tree had been noticed as far back as 1810, when the Baron of Maldà mentioned it in his diary.

At the 1921 rally at the site, following a campaign by poet-politician Ventura Gassol, Pi Jove was inaugurated as the successor to the then-dead main tree. Speaking at the event, Gassol invited the landowner, who was present, to donate the tree to the Commonwealth of Catalonia (a semi-recognised autonomous government), but he declined, saying that practical effort is more important than symbols.

It has since become the main attraction for younger and more radical elements of the nationalist movement. The older and younger trees are often simply called "el Pi Vell" (the old pine) and "el Pi Jove" (the young pine) respectively, to distinguish the two.

Along with Pi Vell, Pi Jove was registered as a protected "monumental tree" in 1987.

=== Damage ===
Unlike Pi Vell, Pi Jove had escaped the attentions of vandals until more recently, due to its lower political profile and greater distance (200 m) from the road. In 2010, it was discovered with a circumferential cut through the bark, in addition to apparent shotgun damage. Vandals attacked it in June 2015, attempting to saw through one of its trunks, though it was not thought that the damage was serious enough to kill the affected trunk. As a precaution, in December 2015 arborists installed a frame to hold the three trunks together and ensure their stability. In January 2016, deeper chainsaw cuts were discovered on the already-damaged trunk which are believed harsh enough to kill the trunk altogether; these vandals also attacked Pi Vell.

== The annual gathering ==
Pi de les Tres Branques, as a symbol of the united Catalan Countries, or simply of Catalan self-determination, has been the site of large political rallies since the turn of the 20th century, at first sporadically, but annually since 1980.

The first record of a political assembly there was in October 1900, when a large (Note: between 50 and 400, depending on the sources) group of Carlist troops, led by Josep Grandia, based themselves there in preparation for their part in the failed Carlist uprising.

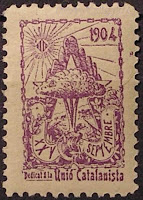
1904 promotional stamp issued by the Catalanist Union featuring Pi de les Tres Branques and the date 25 September

The first major rally was in 1904 when the Catalanist Union organised an assembly there to celebrate its acquisition of the site, on Sunday 25 September. The ceremony, and associated events in Berga the day before, attracted several hundred activists, with messages from foreign sympathisers being read out. Another rally was held in 1915.

The next major rally was held in 1921, on 25 July, the St. James holiday; a key point of that event included the inauguration of Pi Jove as the intended replacement for the original tree.

Subsequent political developments made it difficult to hold large organised rallies at the site. Catalan political gatherings were banned during the 1923–1930 dictatorship of Miguel Primo de Rivera, travel was difficult during the 1936–1939 Spanish Civil War, and political gatherings were again banned in Francoist Spain (1939–1975) and for some time after.

It was not until 1980, following the restoration of democracy in Spain, that the first annual gathering of the modern era took place, starting a tradition of a large gathering at the site on the third Sunday of July each year.

Attendance at the gathering has varied; the 1980 inaugural gathering attracted 3,000 visitors, reached a peak of 14,000 in 1986, but has since declined, with attendances of 2,000 in 2001, 1,000 in 2012 and 1,500 in 2014.

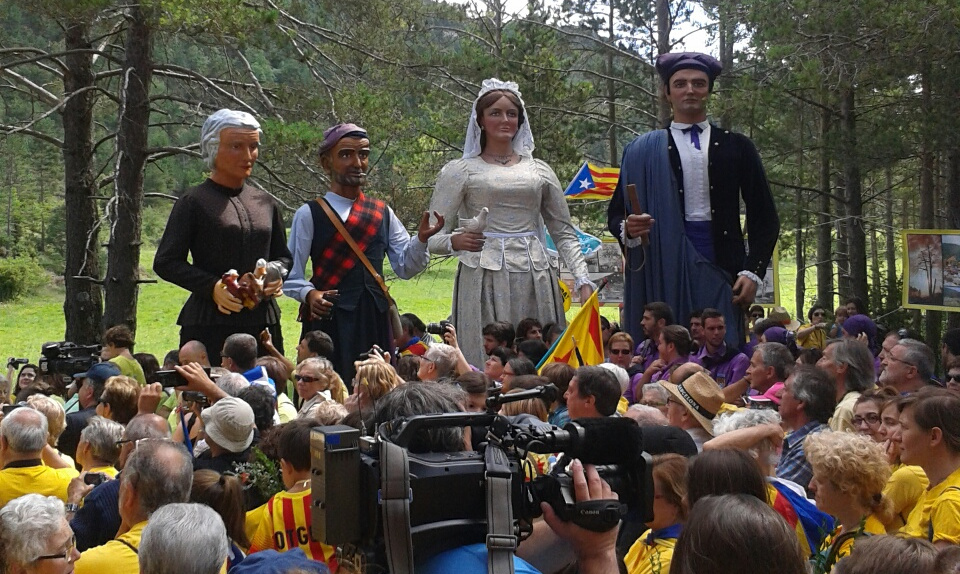
Gegants at the 2014 gathering

It attracts Catalan nationalists of many different viewpoints, including those attending a mass, political activists from the entire nationalist spectrum left and right giving speeches, organisations hosting stands and selling political books and souvenirs, and performers of traditional Catalan cultural activities such as sardana bands and dancers, castellers (human towers), and gegants (giant puppets). The gathering also marks the culmination of the four-day El Rebrot ("The Shoot") musical/political festival which has been held in Berga almost every year (Note: It was held at Argentona in 2007) since 2001, organised by the Maulets/Arran left-wing youth organisation.

Because of the shortage of parking at the site, shuttle buses are provided by Berga town council, who also organise catering for the crowds in the town after the event.

=== Controversies ===
Events at the gathering have several times resulted in controversies, and clashes between rival political factions. Following the 1981 event, the Catalan parliament president Heribert Barrera, two parliamentary deputies, and several others, faced criminal charges of "insulting the feelings and unity of the Spanish nation and distributing illegal publications". The charges were dropped after three years. The 1986 gathering was marred by the burning of Spanish flags and harassment of moderate groups. As a result, the mainstream political parties Democratic Convergence and Republican Left stayed away from the 1987 event. In 1988, different factions of the far-left Movement for Defence of the Land (MDT) fought each other. In 1991, MDT militants attacked youth members of Democratic Convergence and Republican Left, and in 1996, hooded left-wing militants came from their assembly at Pi Jove to attack members of Estat Català at Pi Vell. Since the events of 1996, the authorities have increased security at the gathering, and the event has returned to a peaceful cultural atmosphere.

== Management and development plans ==
Although both Pi Vell and Pi Jove are officially protected, they are easily accessible in an isolated wooded area, and therefore vulnerable to vandalism as well as natural hazards such as lightning and wildfire. Several proposals have been made over the years to improve the site.

Around 1990, a private business identified the Campllong valley, with Pi de les Tres Branques as a central attraction, as one of the possible locations for a large-scale Catalan-identity theme park called "Identirama". A different site was eventually selected, but the project was abandoned.

In 2003, the Catalan parliament passed a resolution urging development of a government plan to improve the site. A government report in 2001, re-published in 2004, included a proposal to cut down the fragile Pi Vell, leaving the stump in place along with a commemorative monument, and purchase and develop the site as a public amenity.

The attack on Pi Jove in 2010 prompted activists to complain about perceived ongoing lack of action by the authorities, and prompted the local municipality of Castellar del Riu to start work with interested parties to develop a plan to secure the site. In 2012 the mayor announced plans to take over the maintenance of the land around the two trees and develop facilities for visitors, including a car park and information panels.

In March 2015, following the serious attack on Pi Vell ten months before, the government set up a working group consisting of representatives of the Barcelona provincial administration, the local municipality, and the Institute of Catalan Studies, to manage the maintenance and protection of the two trees. The first result was the repair of the damaged tree in July, and in February 2016 they decided to place video security cameras at the site, watching both trees.

== Other associated three-branched pines ==
Another similarly named tree is Pi de les Tres Branques de Freixinet, located near the village of Freixinet in the municipality of Riner in central Catalonia. (Note: Coordinates: 41.931758°N 1.573682°E) This tree is also protected by the Catalan government, since 1988, but was killed in a forest fire in 1998.

In recent times, local bodies such as the municipality of Castellar del Riu or Berga or the local branch of the Catalan National Assembly, have adopted the practice of presenting a young three-branched pine tree or sapling claimed to be a descendant of Pi de les Tres Branques to other bodies, as symbols of solidarity. Early examples include presentations to the Castle of Gallifa in 1986, and the Castle of St. Ferran in Berga in 1992 (along with a sapling of the Tree of Guernica). The practice gained momentum following the February 2014 presentation of a young tree to the town of Folgueroles, to commemorate Jacint Verdaguer who was born there; that tree has since been vandalised. Subsequent 2014 recipients have included Andorra la Vella, Sant Hipòlit de Voltregà, and Saldes. The Forest Museum in Sant Celoni also claims to have five descendants of Pi de les Tres Branques in its grounds.

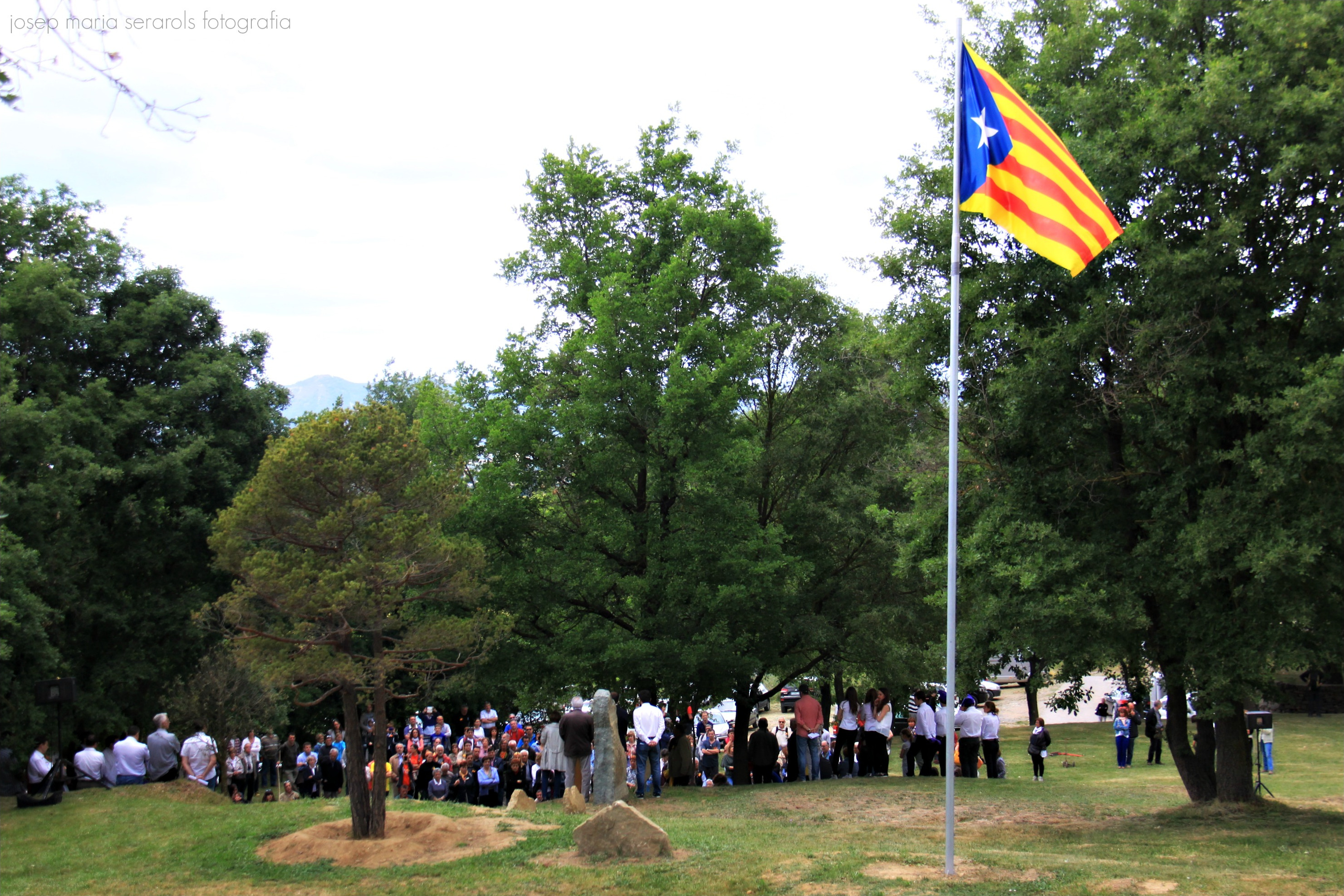
Ceremony at Pi de les Tres Branques of Folgueroles (at left), May 2014

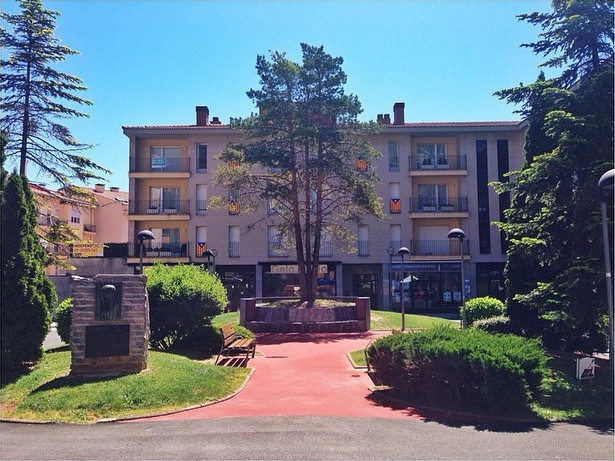
In Plaça dels Països Catalans, Berga town

== See also ==
- List of individual trees
- National symbols of Catalonia
