= Josep Llorens i Artigas =

Spanish ceramist

- Born: 16 June 1892; Barcelona
- Died: 11 December 1980 (aged 88); Barcelona

Josep Llorens i Artigas (16 June 1892 – 11 December 1980) was a Spanish ceramic artist known for his collaboration with Joan Miró. He is credited with relaunching ceramics as a European art form.

== Life ==
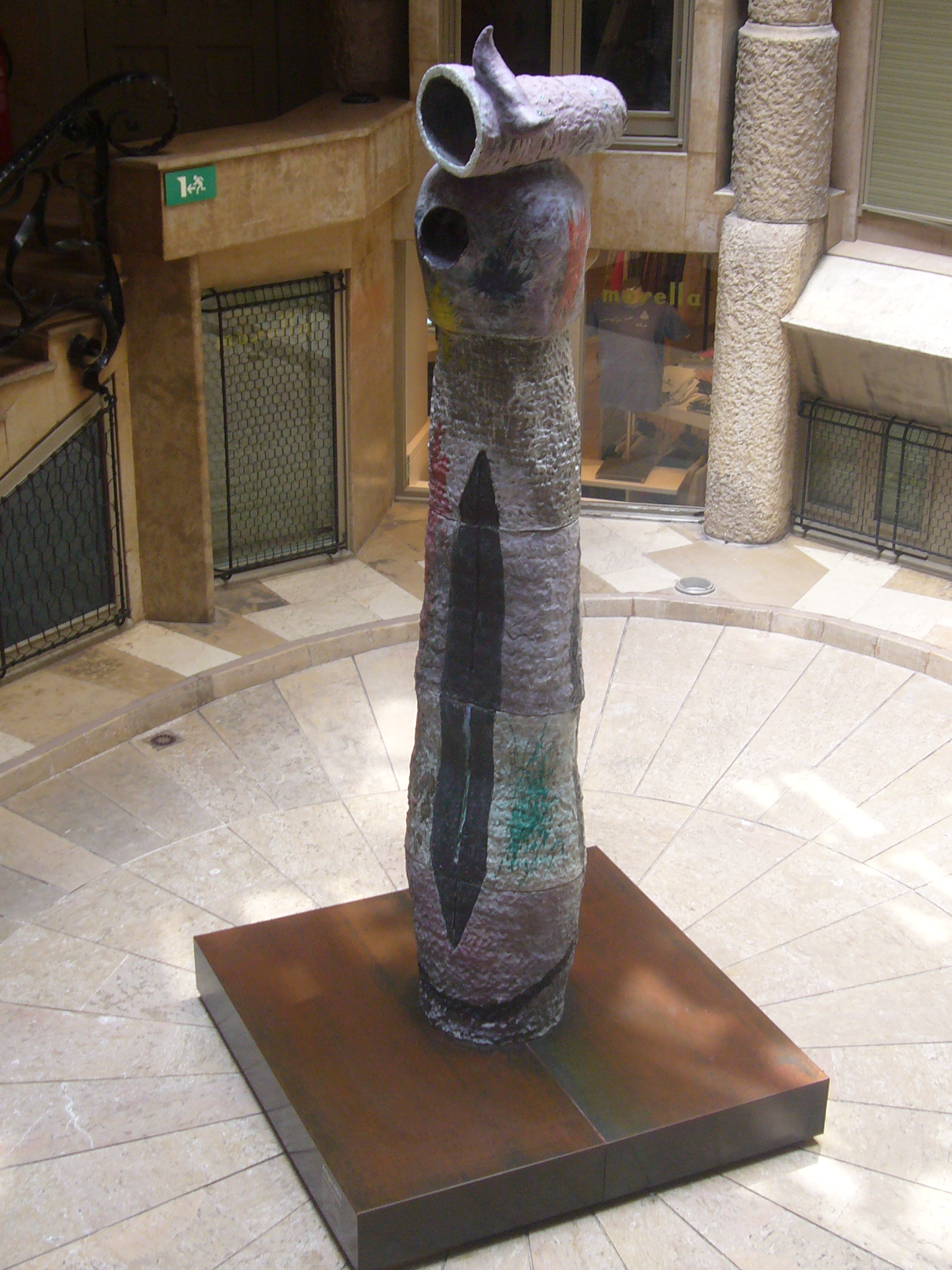
Woman and Bird (1962), a collaborative work by Joan Miró and Josep Llorens i Artigas

Artigas was born in Barcelona on 16 June 1892. He went to Escola superior d'arts i indústries i belles arts. He worked as an art critic on the Barcelona-based newspaper La Veu. Artigas went to France and he wrote a thesis on Egyptian pottery and their blue glazes at the Sorbonne. In 1924 he had a studio on the rue Blomet in Paris. There he joined the avant-garde joining a group originally started by Gustave Courbet. He met Albert Marquet, Raoul Dufy, Pablo Picasso, Luis Buñuel and Georges Braque.

In 1930 Buñuel created the surrealist film L'Age d'Or which included actors who were to be famous artists like Max Ernst. Llorens Artigas plays a governor who lays a foundation stone.

In 1936 he returned to Barcelona during the Spanish Civil War. He earned his living by teaching ceramics. In 1941 he began to extend his influence over ceramics when he became a teacher at the Escuela Massana in Barcelona. In 1944 he started his and his family's long partnership with Joan Miró, initially creating vases.

In 1953 Miró and Artigas worked at Artigas's studio in Gallifa near Barcelona. There they created "firestones" which they exhibited under their joint names including in 1956 a joint exhibition in New York. The following year the two worked on a mural for the UNESCO headquarters and for the University of Harvard. It was Artigas's role to render Miró's designs into the 585 ceramics plates. The tiles that made up the two murals for the UNESCO building were created in Gallifa and Miró supervised their installation in Paris. The murals are called "The Wall of the Sun" and "The Wall of the Moon". They were originally displayed outside but they are now contained within a building built to preserve them. Miró was to win a Guggenheim Prize for one of the murals in 1958.

The two worked together until Artigas's failing health meant that his son, Joan Gardy Artigas, took over his role.

Llorens i Artigas died in 1980 in his home city. In 1989 his son set up a foundation in the name of his father which exists to improve both artists and their art.
