= Wall of the Sun and Wall of the Moon =

Pair of murals in Paris designed by Joan Miró

The Wall of the Sun
- Artist: Joan Miró i Ferrà and Josep Llorens i Artigas
- Year: 1955–1958
- Dimensions: 2.20 m × 15 m (7.2 ft × 49 ft)
- Location: UNESCO building, Paris
- 48°50′58″N 2°18′22″E

The Wall of the Moon
- Artist: Joan Miró i Ferrà and Josep Llorens i Artigas
- Year: 1955–1958
- Dimensions: 2.20 m × 7.50 m (7.2 ft × 24.6 ft)
- Location: UNESCO building, Paris
- 48°50′58″N 2°18′22″E

The Wall of the Sun and Wall of the Moon are a pair of murals made of ceramics and designed by the Catalan artist Joan Miró for the UNESCO building in Paris. The works were carried out by the ceramicist Josep Llorens Artigas in 1955. Initially, the walls were installed on the Place de Fontenoy in Paris, but afterwards were enclosed in a building that was constructed in order to protect them from damage caused by acid rain.

== History ==
Joan Miró and Josep Llorens Artigas met in 1910 at the school of art of the artist Francesc Galí (1880–1965), in Barcelona. Since the 1940s, Miró and Josep Llorens Artigas started an artistic duo that spawned objects and large ceramic murals such as one at the Unesco building in Paris or the ceramic wall of the Barcelona Airport. These works fused Miró lexicon with the essential qualities of the arts of earth and fire.

In 1955 Joan Miró was contacted by the heads of UNESCO to ask if he wanted to take part of the team of artists that decorated the future headquarters of the institution that is located in Paris. Once agreed, they granted the exterior walls of the building conferences, two perpendicular walls of three meters high and seven meters long and fifteen, respectively. Miró proposed to make a ceramic mural in collaboration with Llorens Artigas.

In 1956, Miró began working on the mural in his studio in Palma. The following year he went to the Caves of Altamira in with Llorens Artigas inspired to carry on the work, by seeing "the first mural in the world". They also visited the Collegiate church and cloister of St Juliana and the romanesque collection of the Museum of Art of Catalonia, the current MNAC.

=== Construction ===
Once inspired, Miró moved to Gallifa, at the workshop of Artigas, to proceed to prepare the tile mural. It took 35 batches, 25 tons of wood, 4 tons of sandstone and 200 kilos of enamel. Once finished, the pieces were transported to Paris. Although he had worked in large formats, he had never done ceramics. Beside the ceramist Josep Llorens Artigas, they failed to find technical feasibility for baking pottery in a way that allows to obtain a background textures similar to the paintings of that time. It was decided that the composition was on the subjects of "Sun" and "Moon".

=== Inauguration ===
The two mosaic murals were assembled in situ by a team of technicians under the direct supervision of Miró and Llorens Artigas. The works were inaugurated in 1958, as same as the building, and received rave reviews. Even one of the murals, the Wall of the Sun won the Biennial Prize of Guggenheim Foundation. Miró later returned to work for UNESCO, designing the UNESCO Medal for Pablo Picasso.

=== Conservation ===
Initially, the walls were outdoors, but later moved inside the building to protect them from damage caused by acid rain.

== Awards and recognition ==
- 1958 - The biennial international award of the Guggenheim Foundation for the Wall of the Sun.

== Bibliography ==
- Dupin, Jacques (1993). Polígrafa (ed.). Miró. Barcelona. pp. 390–391. ISBN 84-343-0726-X.
- Escudero, Carme; Montaner, Teresa (2001). Fundació Joan Miró (ed.). Joan Miró, desfilada d'obsessions: 14 juny-2 setembre 2001. Barcelona. ISBN 84-923925-9-2.
- Punyet Miró, Joan; Gardy Artigas, Joan; Calero, Cristina (2007). D. Lelong (ed.). Joan Miró, Josep Llorens Artigas: ceramics: catalogue raisonné, 1941-1981. Paris. pp. 338–399. ISBN 978-2-86882-079-2.
- Penrose, Roland (1993). Thames and Hudson (ed.). Miró. London. ISBN 84-233-1976-8.
