= Palacio de Congresos (Madrid) =

Convention center in Madrid, Spain

Coordinates: 40.45289°N 3.69115°W

Palacio de Congresos de Madrid
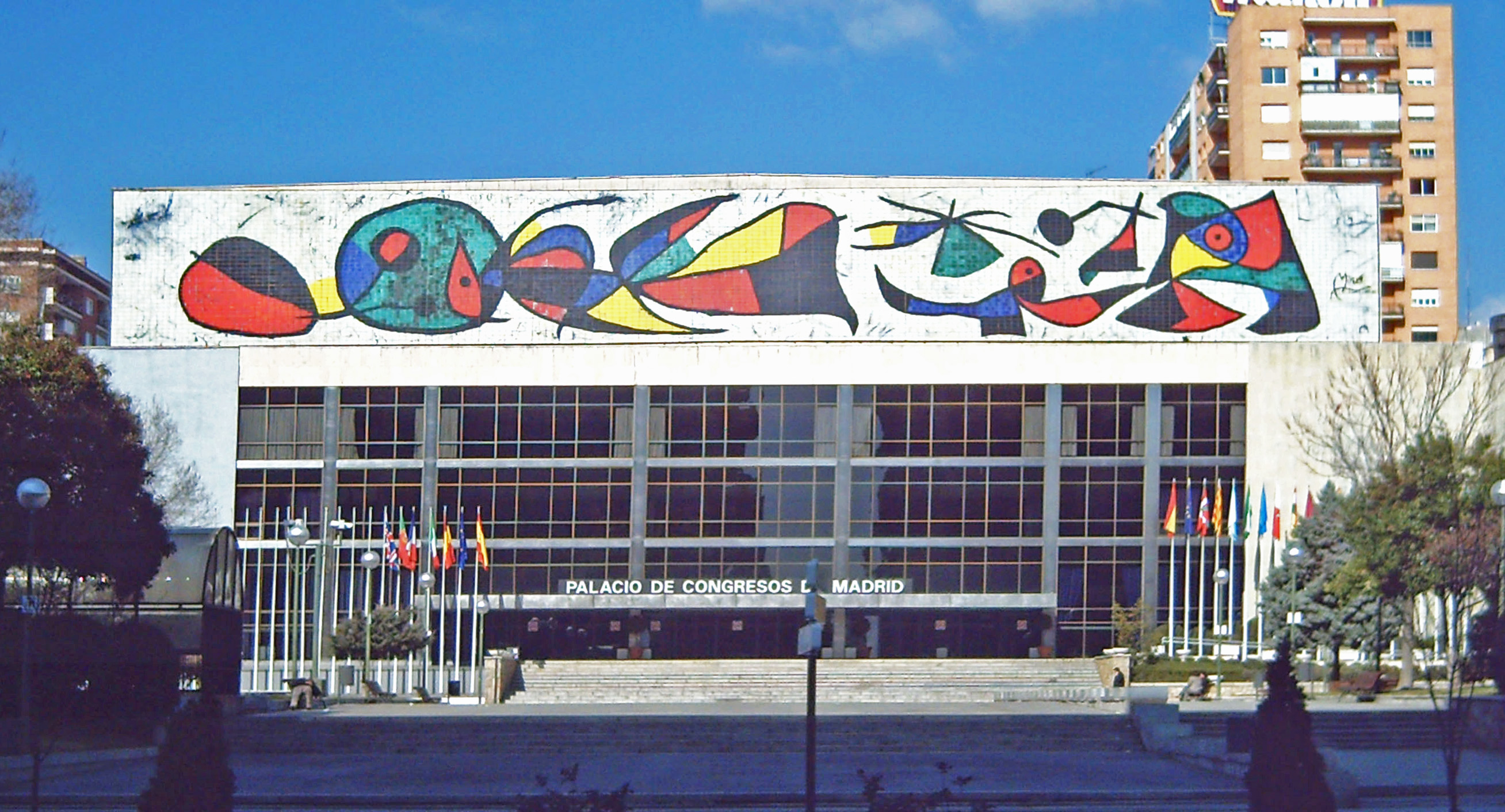
- Interactive map of the Palacio de Congresos de Madrid area
- Alternative names: Palacio de Congresos; Palacio de Congresos y Exposiciones

General information
- Type: Convention centre
- Location: Paseo de la Castellana, 99, 28046, Madrid, Spain
- Current tenants: None
- Opened: 1 June 1970

Design and construction
- Architect: Pablo Pintado Riba

The Palacio de Congresos de Madrid, also known as Palacio de Congresos or Palacio de Congresos y Exposiciones, is a convention centre in Madrid, Spain. Located in the Paseo de la Castellana, it is unused since 2012. The building's façade prominently displays a ceramic mosaic reproducing a work by Joan Miró.

== History ==
The building's plot lies on the intersection of the Paseo de la Castellana with the Avenida del General Perón, in the Cuatro Caminos neighborhood, Tetuán district. It was designed by Pablo Pintado y Riba, who was awarded with the tender in 1964. It was inaugurated on 1 June 1970. On 25 November 1972, the auditorium hosted the first edition of the OTI Festival. A large ceramic mosaic created by Joan Gardy Artigas based on a sketch by Joan Miró was added to the façade. The renovation was inaugurated on 5 October 1980 by Mayor Enrique Tierno Galván.

The Palacio de Congresos hosted the press centre of the 1982 FIFA World Cup, for which a temporary skyway across La Castellana to connect the building to the Santiago Bernabéu Stadium was built and then dismantled. The Goya Awards were celebrated at the congress centre since the second edition in 1988 until they moved to the Palacio Municipal de Congresos, in Campo de las Naciones. The building closed in late 2012 to remedy deficiencies in security. It has been unused from then on.

Mayors Manuela Carmena and José Luis Martínez-Almeida have asked for the building's reopening. A 2018 agreement to transfer the building's management to IFEMA did not come to fruition. A viability plan published in 2020 by Turespaña, the Spanish government agency for tourism promotion, contemplated a 40-year lease, presumably to host the headquarters of the UN's World Tourism Organization (UNWTO), currently located in the neighbouring Calle del Poeta Joan Maragall.
