= Florida (disambiguation) =

Florida is a state in the southeastern United States.

Florida may also refer to:

== Places ==
=== Africa ===
- Florida, Gauteng, South Africa
  - Florida (House of Assembly of South Africa constituency)

=== Caribbean ===
- Florida, Cuba, a municipality in Camaguey Province, Cuba
- Florida, Puerto Rico, a municipality of Puerto Rico
- Florida, San Lorenzo, Puerto Rico, a barrio of San Lorenzo
- Florida, Vieques, Puerto Rico, a barrio of Vieques
- Florida Afuera, Barceloneta, Puerto Rico, a barrio of Barceloneta
- Florida Adentro, Florida, Puerto Rico, a barrio of the municipality of Florida in Puerto Rico

=== Europe ===
- Florida (Barcelona Metro), a station in Barcelona, Spain
- Mount Florida, a neighborhood of Glasgow, Scotland
- Mount Florida railway station, a station in Glasgow, Scotland
- Strata Florida Abbey, a Cistercian abbey in Ceredigion, Wales
- Strata Florida railway station, a former station in Ceredigion, Wales
- Ystrad Fflur, a hamlet in Ceredigion, Wales, also known as Strata Florida
- Florida, Vologda Oblast, a village of Sheksninsky District in Russia

=== South America ===
==== Argentina ====
- Florida, Buenos Aires, a neighborhood of Vicente López Partido
- Florida Street in Buenos Aires
- Florida (Buenos Aires Metro), a station in Buenos Aires

==== Bolivia ====
- Florida Province, province of the Santa Cruz Department

==== Brazil ====
- Flórida Paulista, a municipality in the state of São Paulo
- Flórida, Paraná

==== Chile ====
- Florida, Chile, a commune in the Concepción Province
- La Florida, Chile, commune in the Santiago Province

==== Colombia ====
- Florida, Valle del Cauca

==== Peru ====
- Florida District, Peru

==== Uruguay ====
- Florida Department, one of the 19 departments that form the nation of Uruguay
- Florida, Uruguay, the capital city of the Florida Department

=== North America ===
==== Canada ====
- Florida, Cochrane District, in Cochrane District, Ontario
- Florida, Frontenac County, in the city of Kingston, Frontenac County, Ontario

==== United States ====
- Florida, Colorado
- Florida, Indiana
- Florida, Massachusetts
- Florida, Michigan
- Florida, Missouri
- Florida, Montgomery County, New York
- Florida, Orange County, New York
- Florida, Ohio
- Florida City, Florida
- Florida Creek, in Missouri
- Florida Parishes, Louisiana, which came from West Florida and were not part of the Louisiana Purchase
- Florida River, in Colorado
- Florida Township, Parke County, Indiana
- Florida Township, Yellow Medicine County, Minnesota
- Florida Avenue, Washington, DC
- Lake Florida, a lake in Minnesota
- Spanish Florida (Florida as a Spanish territory)

=== Elsewhere ===
- Florida, Copán, Honduras
- Florida Islands, in the Solomon Islands in the western Pacific
- Floridablanca, Pampanga, Philippines

== People ==
- Richard Florida (born 1957), American economist
- Florida Jayalath (1936–2007), Sri Lankan Sinhala cinema actress
- Tramar Dillard (born 1979), better known as Flo Rida, American rapper

== Arts, entertainment, and media ==
=== Music ===
==== Albums ====
- Florida (Diplo album), 2004
- Florida (Sofia Talvik album), 2010

==== Songs ====
- "Florida (Where the Sawgrass Meets the Sky)", the state song of Florida
- "Florida", a song by Grandaddy from their 2005 EP Excerpts from the Diary of Todd Zilla
- "Florida", a song by Modest Mouse from their 2007 album We Were Dead Before the Ship Even Sank
- "Florida!!!", a song by Taylor Swift featuring Florence and the Machine from her 2024 album The Tortured Poets Department

==== Other uses in music ====
- Florida (ballet), a ballet by Marius Petipa and Cesare Pugni
- Florida breaks, a genre of electronic music

=== Other uses in arts, entertainment, and media ===
- "Florida" (30 Rock), a 2013 episode of 30 Rock
- "Florida" (Law & Order: Special Victims Unit), 2007
- Florida, a sardana dance by Catalan composer Joan Lamote de Grignon
- Florida Evans, the lead character on the television series Good Times
- A work by Apuleius.

== Ships ==
- Florida, lightship at Carysfort Reef, Florida Keys, 1831–1852
- CSS Florida, various ships of that name
- USS Florida, various ships of that name
- List of ships named SS Florida, various ships of that name

== Sports ==
- Florida Gators, athletic teams of the University of Florida
- Florida Marlins, former name of the Miami Marlins, a Major League Baseball franchise based in Miami Gardens, Florida
- Florida Panthers, National Hockey League franchise based in Sunrise, Florida

== Transportation ==
- GV Florida Transport, a Philippine bus company
- Zastava Florida, also known as Yugo Florida and Nasr Florida 1400, a brand of car made by the Yugoslavian car manufacturer Zastava

== Other uses ==
- Florida group, a Buenos Aires–based avant-garde literary group in the 1920s, also often referred to as the Martín Fierro group
- University of Florida

== See also ==
- Flo Rida
- Floridia
- Floriade (Netherlands)
- La Florida (disambiguation)
