= Gran Via (Barcelona) =

District of Barcelona, Spain

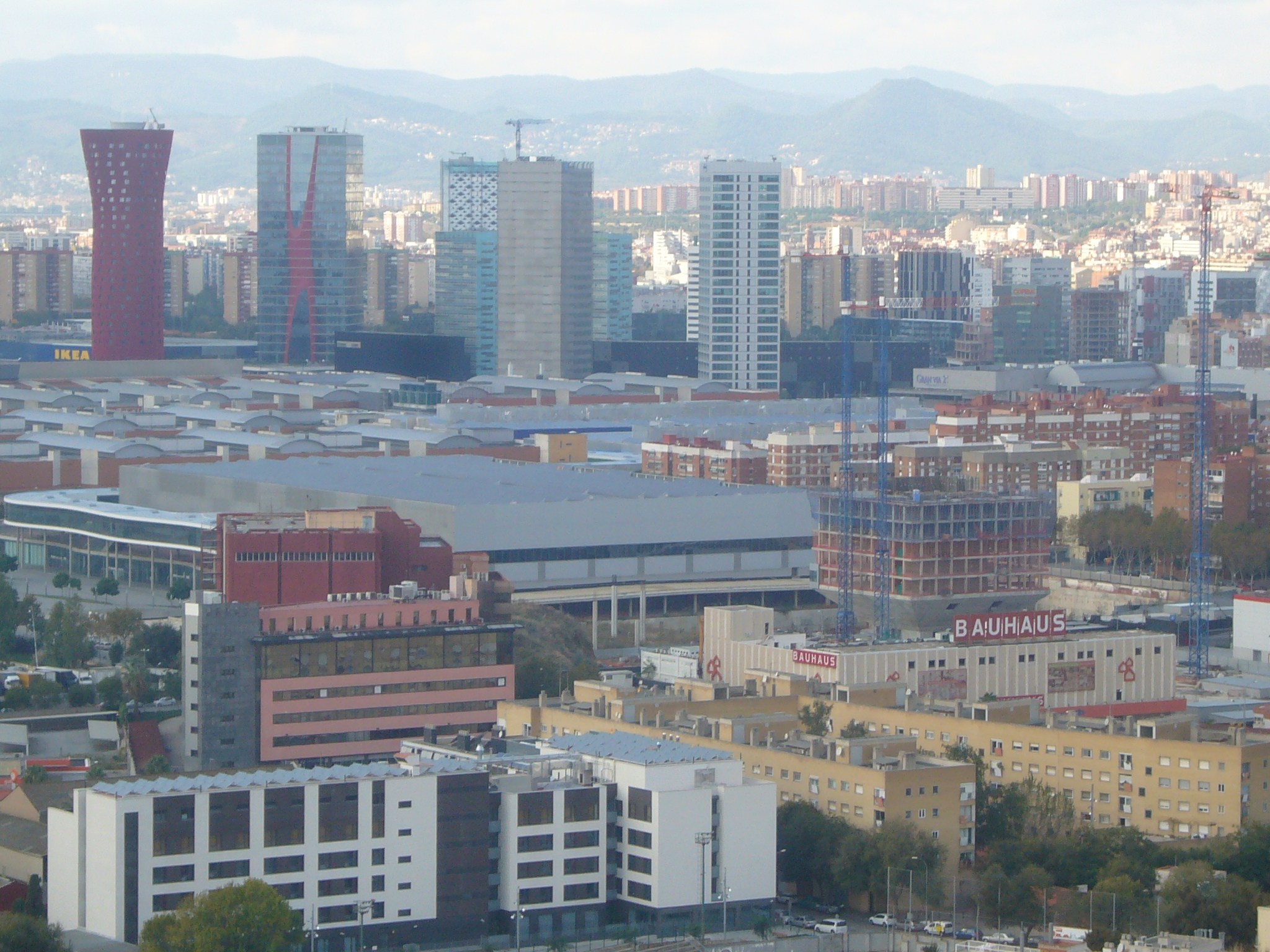

Gran Via (Catalan pronunciation: [ˈɡɾam ˈbi.ə]) is the second major business district of Barcelona, after Diagonal Mar. It forms part of the Fira de Barcelona, the second largest trade fair and exhibition centre in Europe. It straddles the borders between Barcelona, L'Hospitalet de Llobregat and El Prat de Llobregat. The Gran Via business centre consists of the following subdivisions: Gran Via, which has 240,000 m^{2} of exhibition floor space divided into 8 pavilions; the Gran Via Convention Centre, with capacity for 5,600 delegates and a surface area of 14,000 m^{2}; the more than ten skyscrapers alongside Plaza de Europa; also Gran Vía 2 near Barcelona International Airport, which has a shopping centre with 200 shops, 20 restaurants, 15 cinemas and a hypermarket. Gran Via is also adjacent to Ciutat de la Justícia de Barcelona i l'Hospitalet de Llobregat which hosts most of the legal departments of the Barcelona metropolitan area.

== Public transport ==
The "Gran Via" center is served by line 8 of the Barcelona Metro and FGC commuter train network, at the Europa-Fira station, and also by the bus line 79.

== Skyscrapers ==
No	Name	Height	Floors	Year	Used
1	Hotel Porta Fira	113 m	28	2010	Hotel
2	Torre Realia BCN	112 m	24	2010	Offices
3	Renaissance Barcelona Fira Hotel	105 m	25	2011	Hotel
4	Torre Inbisa	104 m	26	2010	Offices
5	Torre Zenit	104 m	26	2008	Offices
6	Torre Europa III	75 m	19	2009	Residencial
7	Torre Europa IV	75 m	19	2009	Residencial
8	Torre Europa V	75 m	19	2009	Residencial

== See also ==
- List of tallest buildings in Barcelona
- Diagonal Mar, major business district of Barcelona
- Gran Via de les Corts Catalanes, more simply known as Gran Via, street in Barcelona
- 22@
- Blau@Ictínea (ca)
- Fira de Barcelona
