= Torres Europa =

Torre Europa 3, 4, 5
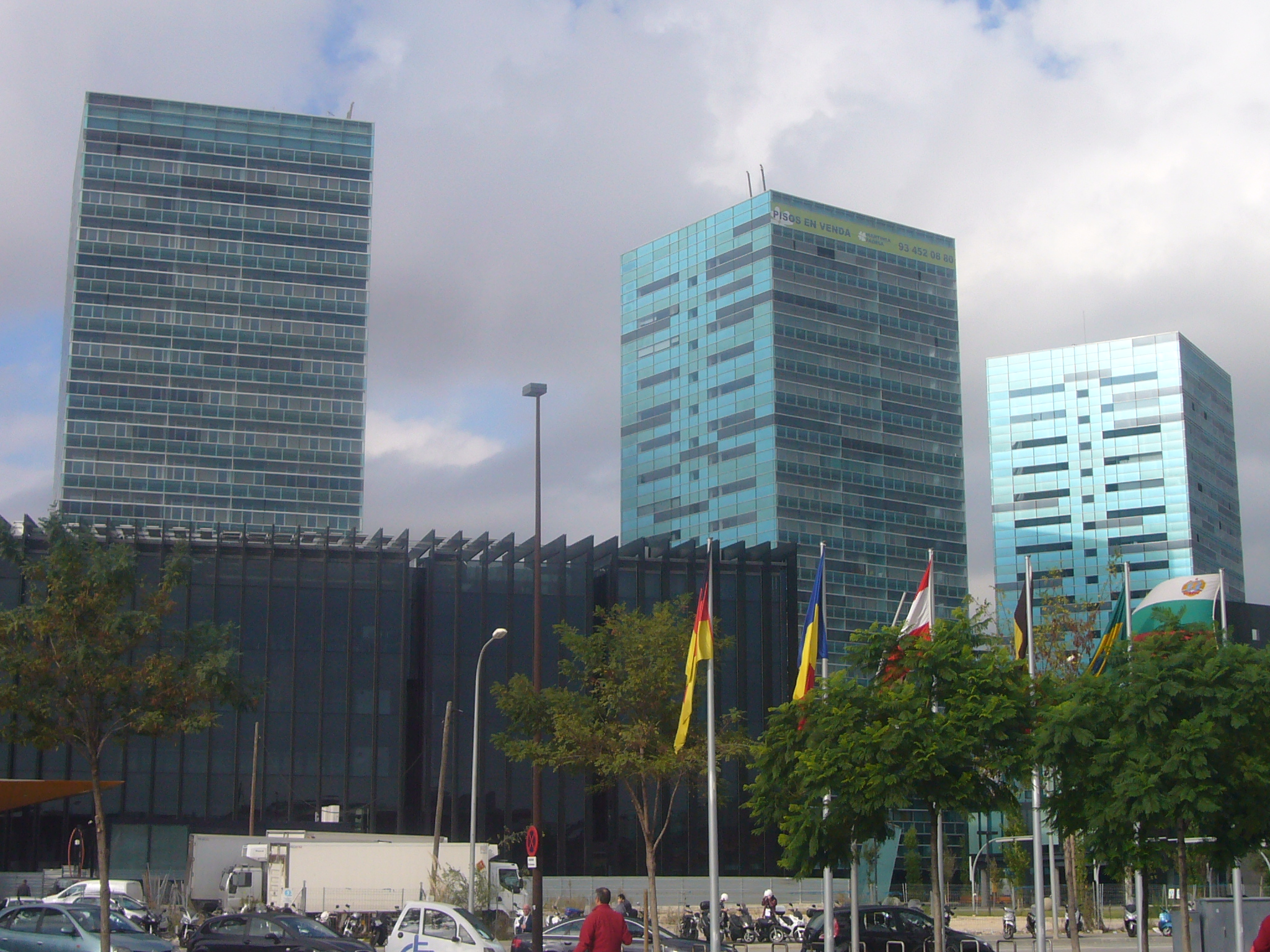
- Interactive map of the Torre Europa 3, 4, 5 area

General information
- Status: Completed
- Type: residencial
- Location: L'Hospitalet de Llobregat (suburb of Barcelona), Catalonia, Spain
- Construction started: 2005
- Completed: 2009

Height
- Height: 75 m (246 ft) - Torre Europa 3, 4, 5

Technical details
- Floor count: 19 - Torre Europa 3, 4, 5

Torre Europa (Torres Europa) - generally, is the name of five skyscrapers of complex buildings in L'Hospitalet de Llobregat (suburb of Barcelona), Spain, with numbers from 1 to 5. However, the Torre Europa 1 has name of Torre Inbisa, the Torre Europa 2 has name of Torre Zenit and both these towers are over 100 meters tall. Other buildings is Torre Europa 3, Torre Europa 4 and Torre Europa 5. Torre Europa 3, 4, 5 has 19 floors and rises 75 meters. All these towers are lies on Plaza de Europa.

== See also ==
- Torre Inbisa (Torre Europa 1)
- Torre Zenit (Torre Europa 2)
- List of tallest buildings and structures in Barcelona
