= Morad (rapper) =

Moroccan rapper (born 1999)

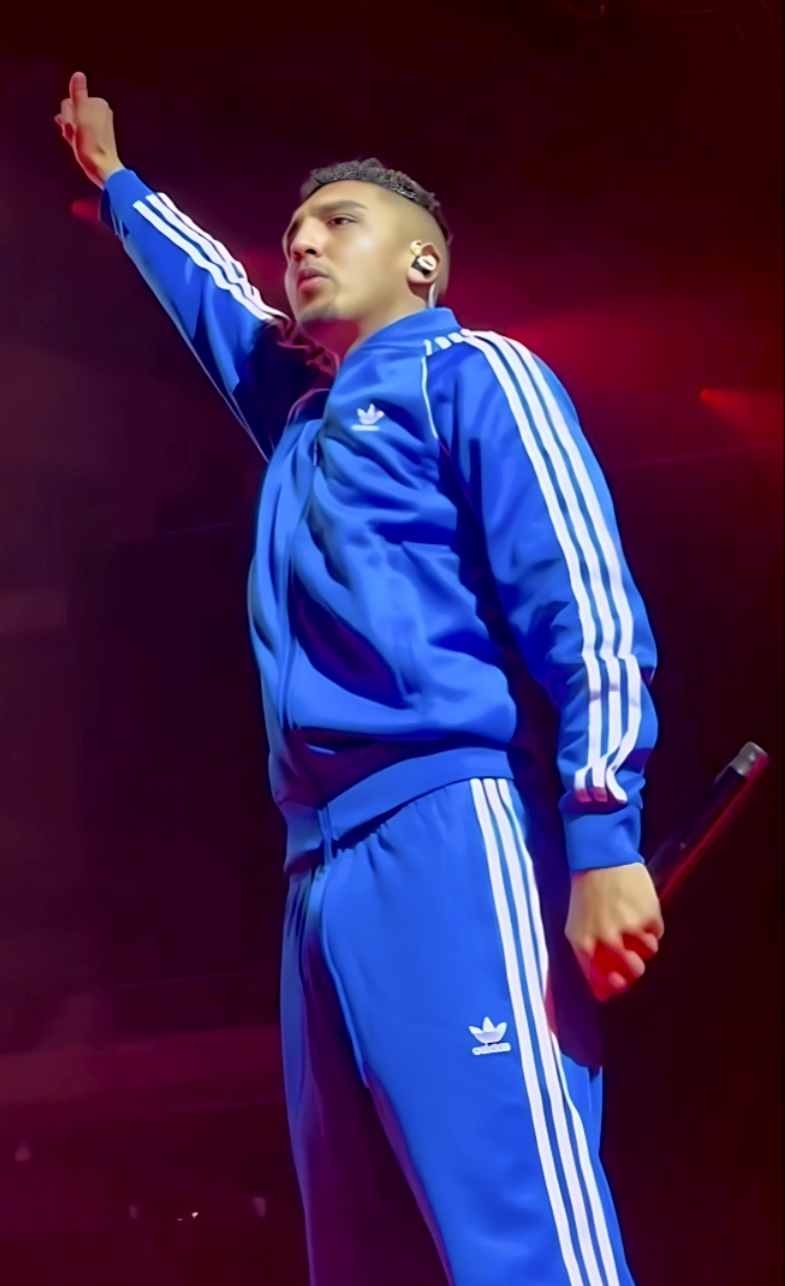
- Morad performing during the Red Bull SoundClash in December 2023

Background information
- Also known as: El Morad; Koala; la K
- Born: Morad El Khattouti El Horami; 5 March 1999 (age 27); L'Hospitalet de Llobregat, Catalonia, Spain
- Genres: Hip-hop; drill; afrobeats
- Occupations: Rapper; singer; songwriter
- Instruments: Vocals
- Years active: 2019 –present
- Label: M.D.L.R

Morad El Khattouti El Horami (Arabic: مراد الخطوطي, romanized: Murād āl-Kẖṭūṭī; born 5 March 1999), known mononymously as Morad, is a Moroccan-Spanish rapper and singer. He released his debut studio album, M.D.L.R, in 2019. Morad topped the PROMUSICAE singles charts with the singles "Bzrp Music Sessions Vol. 47" in 2021, "Pelele" in 2022, and "Manos rotas" in 2023.

== Early life ==
Morad was born on 5 March 1999 in the La Florida neighbourhood of L'Hospitalet de Llobregat, Barcelona, to Moroccan parents. His mother is from Larache and his father was from Nador; the latter abandoned the family when Morad was young. He spent some of his childhood in a children's home. He began rapping with friends at the age of 14 via WhatsApp.

== Career ==
Morad popularised in Spain the abbreviation "M.D.L.R" (Mec de la Rue, French for "street boy"), used by French drill musicians of Maghrebi origin. His 2019 debut album and 2020 extended play were titled MDLR and MDLR 2.0 respectively.

Morad collaborated with Argentine producer Bizarrap on "Bzrp Music Sessions Vol. 47", which topped the PROMUSICAE singles chart for two weeks in late December 2021. His song "Pelele" topped the same chart the following month.

In 2022 Morad released Capítulo 1, a collaborative extended play (EP) with fellow artist Beny Jr. During this period, Morad emerged as the most-streamed emerging drill artist in Spain, according to Spotify statistics. In 2023, he released his second studio album, Reinsertado, which became his most successful project to date.

== Artistry ==
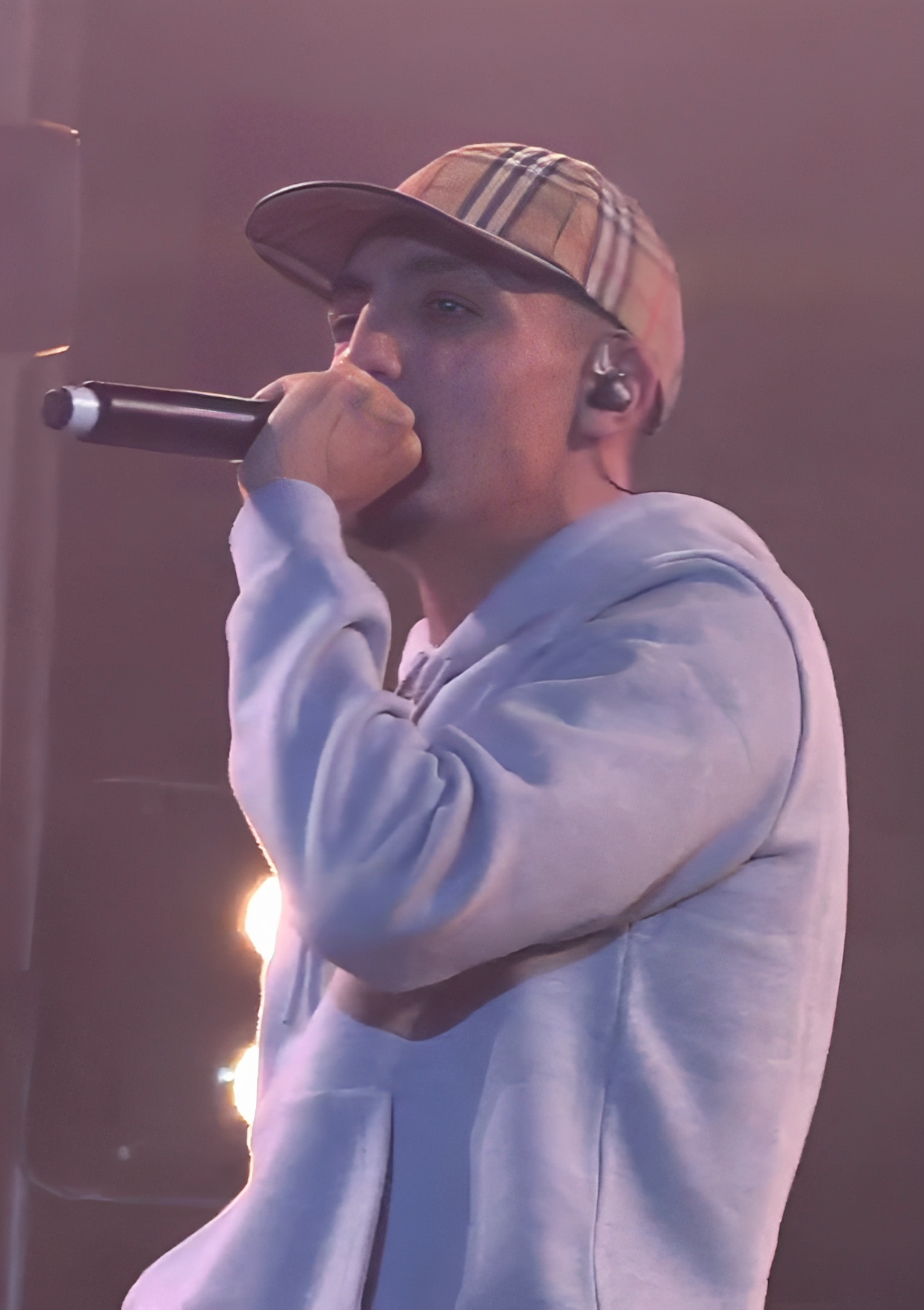
Morad performing in 2022

The source of inspiration for Morad's lyrics comes from his childhood and adolescence experiences and how he moved forward despite juvenile delinquency and the marginal situation in which he lived. He also boasts about telling the "truth" about the street experiences, such as police abuse.

The rapper confesses that music has made him mature and admits that thanks to music he is known, he can make a living with it and outside his neighborhood they look at him differently. He performs mainly in the drill musical style, a style with features in common with French rap of Maghrebi origin. He also calls his music something that does not discriminate races.

== Personal life ==
=== Relationships ===
In the early hours of 27 June 2021, Morad's ex-girlfriend used the key that she kept from their relationship to break into his apartment on the Plaça d'Europa and stab his new girlfriend as she slept next to him. By 9 July, the Civil Guard had found no trace of the attacker's whereabouts. She was convicted in February 2023 and sentenced to nine months in prison; the judge gave a lenient sentence as she believed the attacker was enraged by seeing Morad in bed with another woman.

In March 2025, a sex tape of Morad and his ex-girlfriend leaked online. Neither he nor his representatives commented on the matter.

=== Legal issues ===
Morad and a friend were charged with attempted robbery and threats, alleged to have taken place in the Barcelona neighbourhood of El Putget i Farró in April 2018. In 2022, the prosecution requested a prison sentence of 2 1/2 years, while the defence said that it was a case of mistaken identity. The pair were acquitted when the court heard from a police agent that the images of the suspects did not match the accused.

In April 2022, Morad was arrested for not attending a court hearing for driving without a licence. Two months later, he was arrested again for reckless driving without a licence. In July 2022, he was arrested for disrespecting the police when a car he was a passenger in was stopped for passing a red traffic light.

In July 2022, a judge opened a case against Morad for uploading a video of a member of the Mossos d'Esquadra who had fined him for a parking violation, alongside the false accusation that the police officer was a child abuser.

In October 2022, Morad was arrested on suspicion of having paid young people in La Florida to commit arson. As part of his bail conditions, he was not allowed to return to the neighbourhood.

In February 2023, Morad was arrested and bailed in L'Hospitalet de Llobregat for allegedly threatening a police officer.

In May 2023, prosecutors sought a six-year prison sentence for Morad, for allegedly using a Taser against several Mossos d'Esquadra in L'Hospitalet de Llobregat in July 2021.

=== Political views ===
Morad has voiced support for King Mohammed VI of Morocco and the Moroccan occupation of Western Sahara. In July 2022, a fan in Ourense threw a flag of Western Sahara on stage, which he picked up, believing it to be a flag of Palestine. He apologised to his Moroccan fans for the misunderstanding.

=== Fashion ===
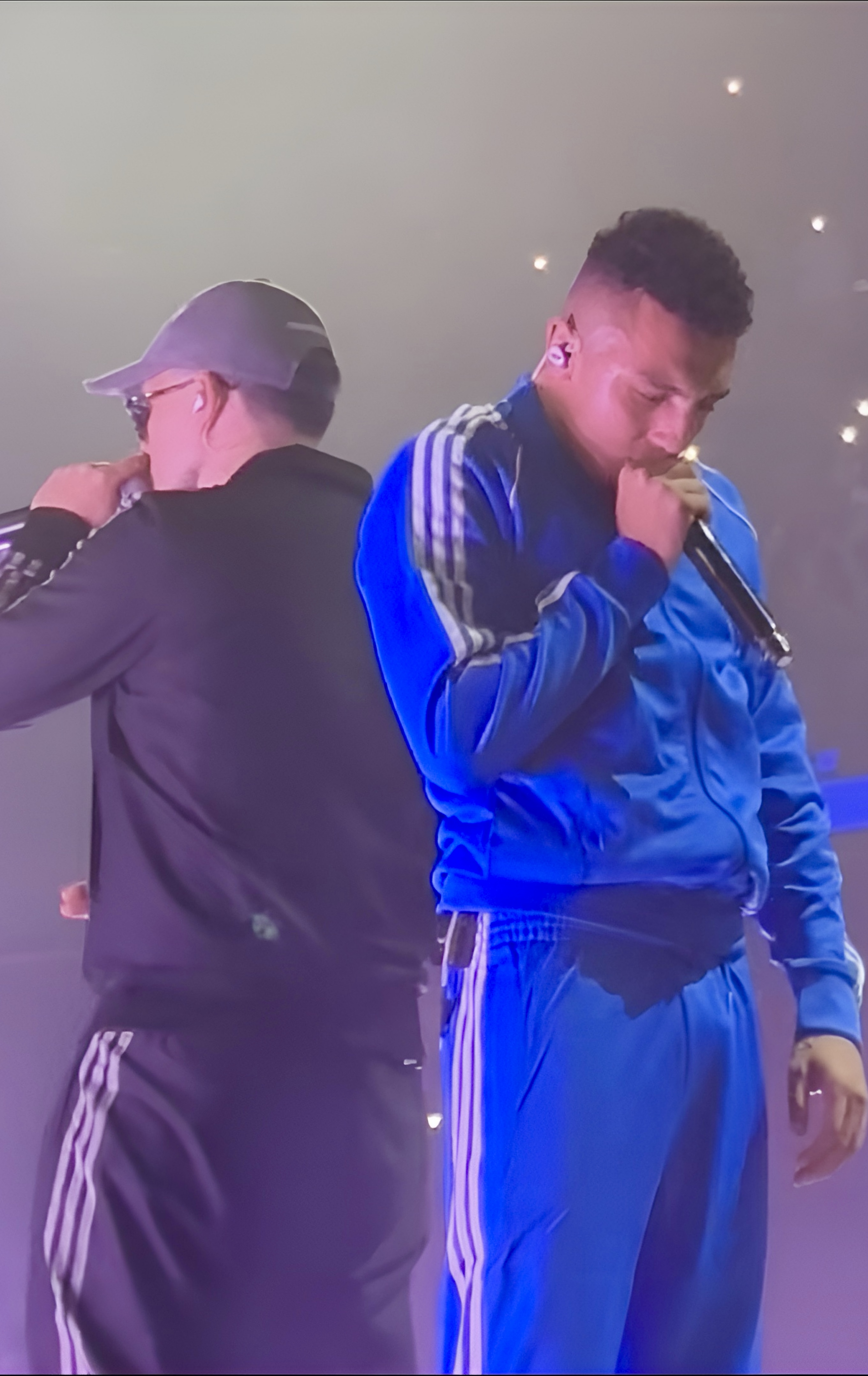
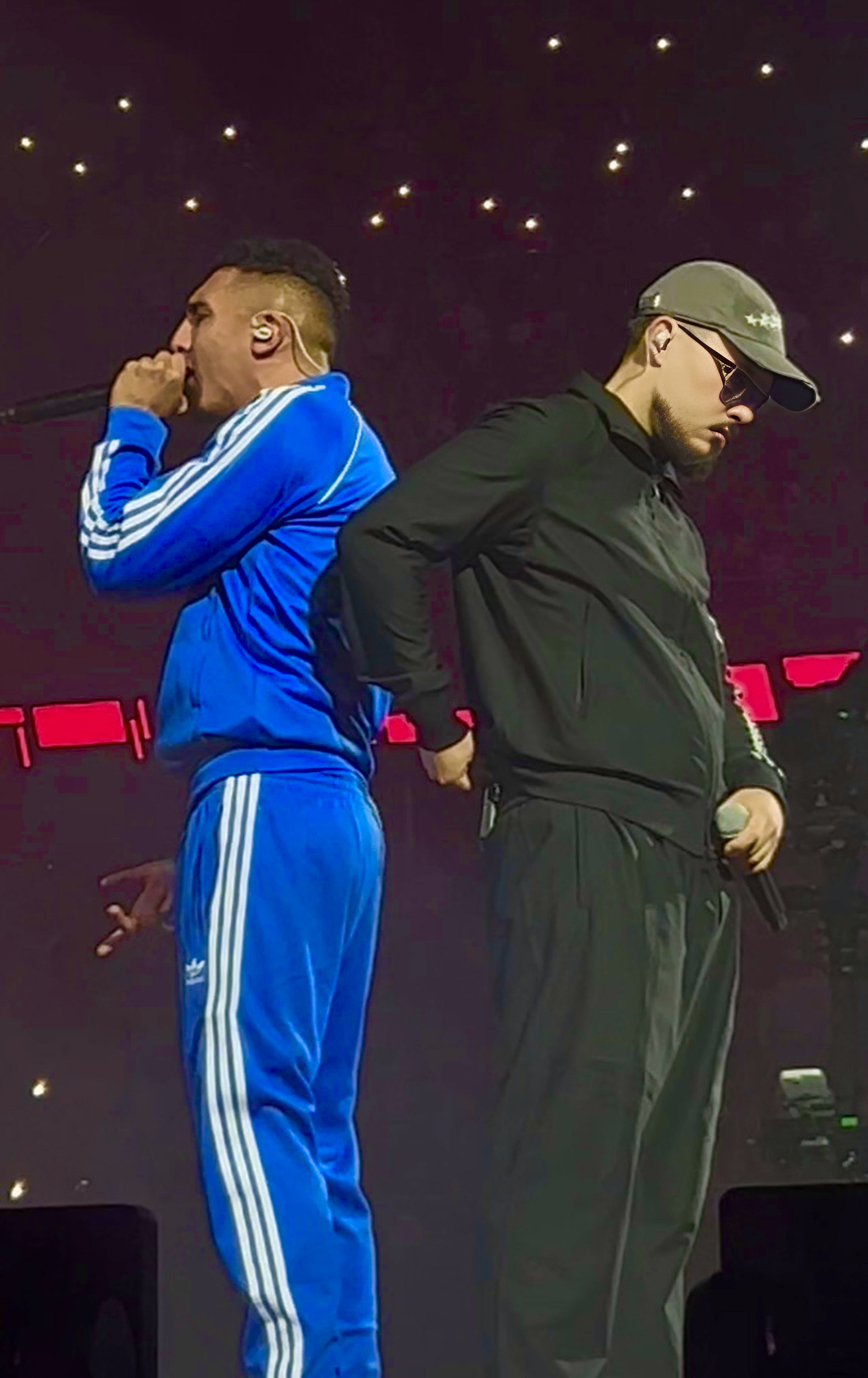
Morad wearing a tracksuit while performing with Dellafuente during the Red Bull SoundClash in December 2023

Morad has frequently worn tracksuits in his music videos and during concerts over the years. In a 2019 interview, he noted that public attitudes towards him had changed following his rise to fame. He explained that he had previously been denied entry to certain places because he wore tracksuits, whereas he could now perform on stage in them. He added that even if he were to attend the Grammy Awards, he would wear a tracksuit. In 2022, he released the single “Chándal” (transl. Tracksuit), in which he raps about wearing tracksuits on various occasions.

In 2022, Morad collaborated with Adidas and launched football jerseys under the concept Adidas x MDLR. After this, he reached an agreement with the brand to sponsor the clothing of the La Florida FC, a club located in the neighborhood where Morad grew up.

=== Other interests ===
Morad is a supporter of football club Real Madrid.

== Discography ==
=== Studio albums ===
- M.D.L.R (2019)
- Reinsertado (2023)

=== Extended plays ===
- M.D.L.R 2.0 (2020)
- Capítulo 1 (with Beny Jr as K y B) (2022)
- Zizou (with Dellafuente) (2023)
- Reinsertado 2.0 (2025)

=== Singles ===
- "Lo Noto" (2022)
- "Niños Pequeños" (2023)
- "Paz" (with Nicki Nicole) (2023)
- "No Estuviste En Lo Malo (remix)" (2023)
- "No Han Cambiado" (2023)
- "Manos Rotas" (with Dellafuente) (2023) No.1 Spain
- "Paris Como Hakimi" (2024)

== Awards and nominations ==
| Year | Awards | Category | Nominated work | Result |
|---|---|---|---|---|
| 2021 | Premios Odeón | Best Urban Album | MDLR | Nominated |
| 2021 | Premios Odeón | Best Urban Revelation | Himself | Nominated |
| 2022 | Premios Odeón | Best Urban Artist | Himself | Nominated |
