= SS Florida =

Several merchant ships have been named SS Florida.

- SS Florida (1889), US propeller, package freighter, Official No. 120753.
- SS Florida (1905), Italian propeller, ocean liner, Official No. 23.
- SS Florida (1931), a steamship used by the Peninsular & Occidental Steamship Company as a transport between Havana, Cuba and Florida

== See also ==
- CSS Florida
- USS Florida
