= La Florida =

La Florida may refer to:

- Spanish Florida, the State of Florida and surrounding areas of the southeastern United States as a former Spanish territory
- Florida, a current U.S. state (Spanish name)
- La Florida (film), a 1993 Canadian film
- La Florida, a solar power plant in Alvarado, Badajoz, Spain

== Geography ==
- La Florida y Luisiana, a community in Cruz Alta Department, Argentina
  - Club Social y Deportivo La Florida, a football team based in La Florida y Luisiana
- La Florida, Chile, a commune in Santiago Province
- La Florida, Nariño, a municipality in Nariño District, Colombia
- La Florida (wetland), a wetland and park in Funza, close to Bogotá
- La Florida District, a district of San Miguel Province, Peru
- La Florida (L'Hospitalet de Llobregat), a neighbourhood in the L'Hospitalet de Llobregat municipality, Catalonia, Spain
- La Florida (park) in Álava, Spain

== See also ==
- Florida (disambiguation)
