= Granvia l'Hospitalet =

Coordinates: 41°21′29″N 2°07′49″E

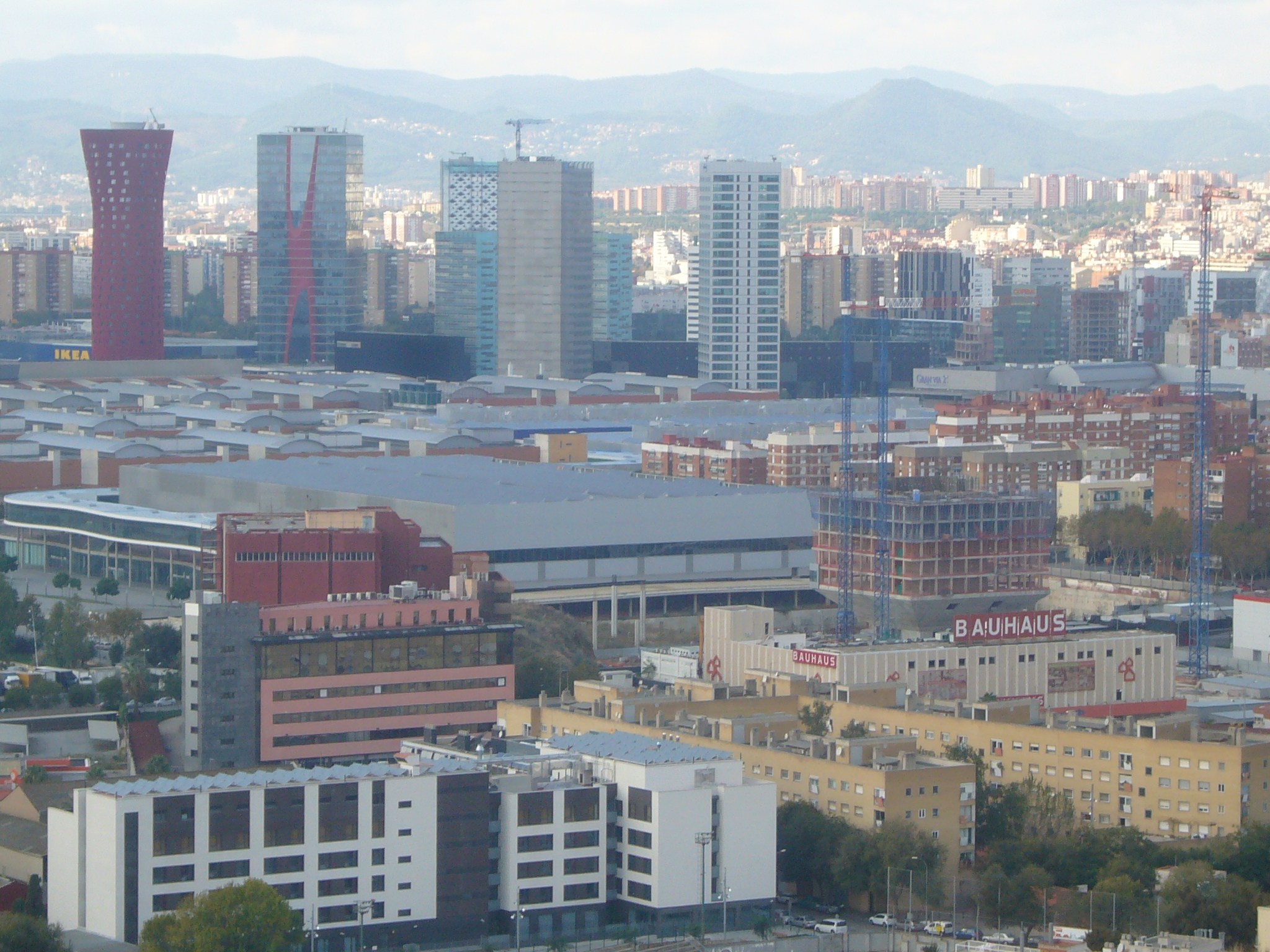
Granvia l'H with Fira de Barcelona in the centre and the skyscrapers of Plaça d'Europa behind

Granvia L'H marked in green

Granvia l'Hospitalet or Granvia l'H ("Districte VII") is a district in the municipality of L'Hospitalet de Llobregat, a south-western suburb of the Barcelona metropolitan area.

Part of Granvia L'H is part of Gran Via business center of Barcelona, and directly Fira de Barcelona, the second-largest trade fair and exhibition centres in Europe.

== Public transport ==
The Granvia area is served by Line 8 of the Barcelona Metro and FGC commuter train network, at the Europa-Fira station, and also by the Bus Line 79.
