= Florida, Ontario =

Florida, Ontario may refer to one of two dispersed rural communities in Ontario, Canada:

- Florida, Cochrane District, in Cochrane District in Northeastern Ontario
- Florida, Frontenac County, in the city of Kingston, Frontenac County, in Eastern Ontario
