= Sequoia of Vitoria-Gasteiz =

Sequoia tree in Spain

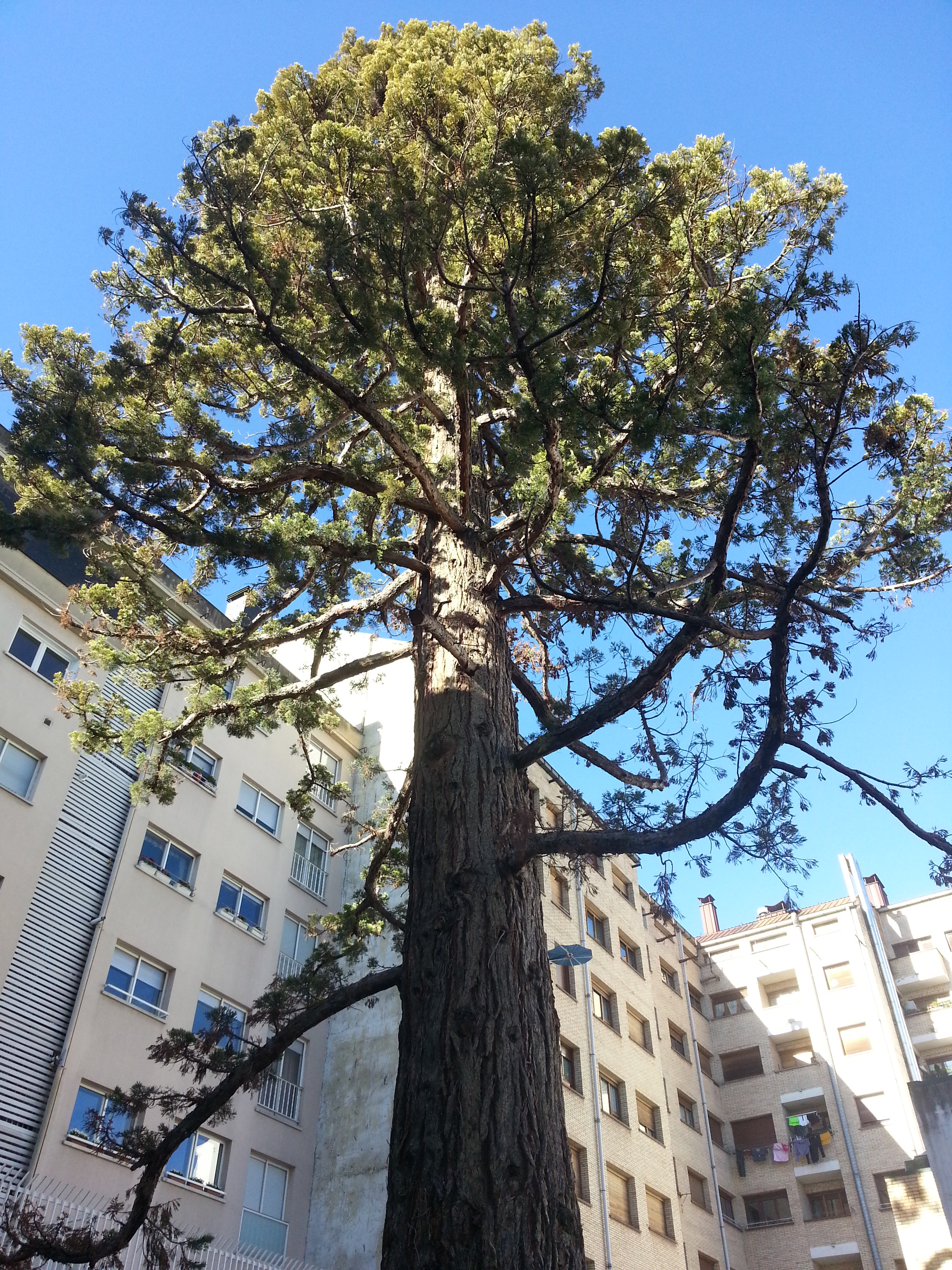
- The sequoia in 2014

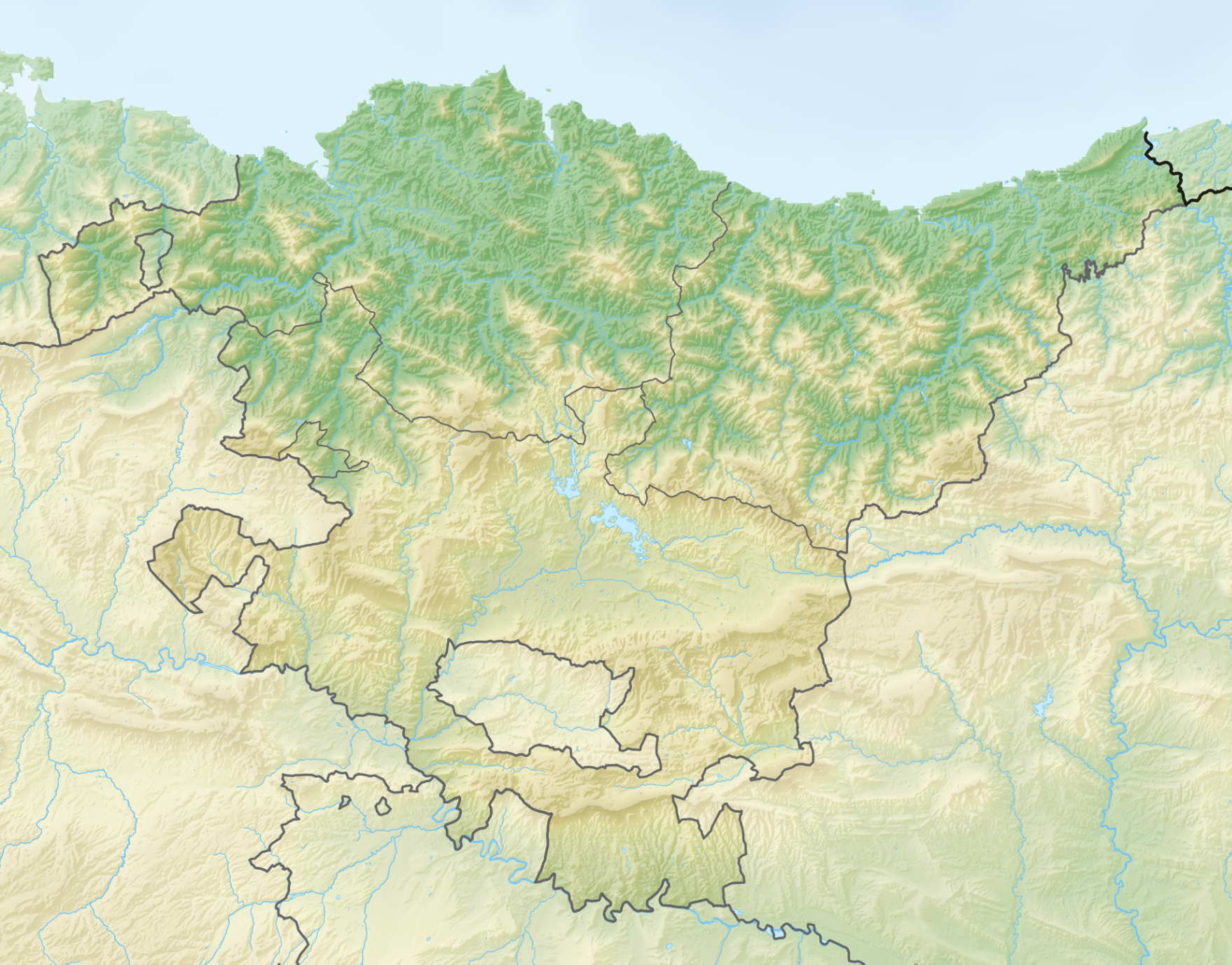
- Location within the Basque Country
- Species: Giant sequoia (Sequoiadendron giganteum)
- Location: Vitoria-Gasteiz, Álava, Basque Country, Spain
- Coordinates: 42°51′N 2°41′W
- Height: 40 m (130 ft)
- Girth: 8.05 m (26.4 ft)

The sequoia of Vitoria-Gasteiz was an individual sequoia tree located in Vitoria-Gasteiz, the capital city of the Basque Country, Spain. It was declared a singular tree by the Basque Government in 1995 and died in 2014.

== History and protection ==
The tree had 40 m (130 ft) of height and 8.05 m (26.4 ft) of girth, its crown had a diameter of 16 metres (52 ft). It was located in the back court of a public building at Magdalena street, close to the Urkide school and near La Florida park. The tree was planted in 1860 by Juan Ibarrondo, who had bought the sapling in Brussels in 1858.

The sequoia is surrounded by walls and buildings, bordering the court of a school. The construction of a nearby building block damaged its roots, and deprived the tree of light. Because it was close to a school, some children's games contributed to trampling the soil. It was proposed that the tree be felled because its dimensions were perceived as a nuisance, but the city council decided to keep the tree as it was. When the tree's leaves started yellowing, the sequoia's condition became worrisome because other sequoias in the city had died gradually. Subsequently, actions aiming to protect the tree began. The initial project was modified by the Deputation, which manages protected trees in Álava. A few wooden platforms were built to help aerate the soil, preventing visitors from walking through it. The rest of the garden was covered with plant remains to prevent visitors from walking on it.

According to a 2014 report, the sequoia had died due to a honey fungus infection. The report suggested that the remains of the tree be pruned in order to increase their stability. It is estimated that the remains will stand for 40 or 60 years without additional conservation efforts.

== See also ==
- List of individual trees
