= Florida Township =

Florida Township may refer to the following townships in the United States:

- Florida Township, Parke County, Indiana
- Florida Township, Yellow Medicine County, Minnesota
- Jefferson Township, Hillsdale County, Michigan, former name of Jefferson Township, Hillsdale County, Michigan
