= La Marina de Sants =

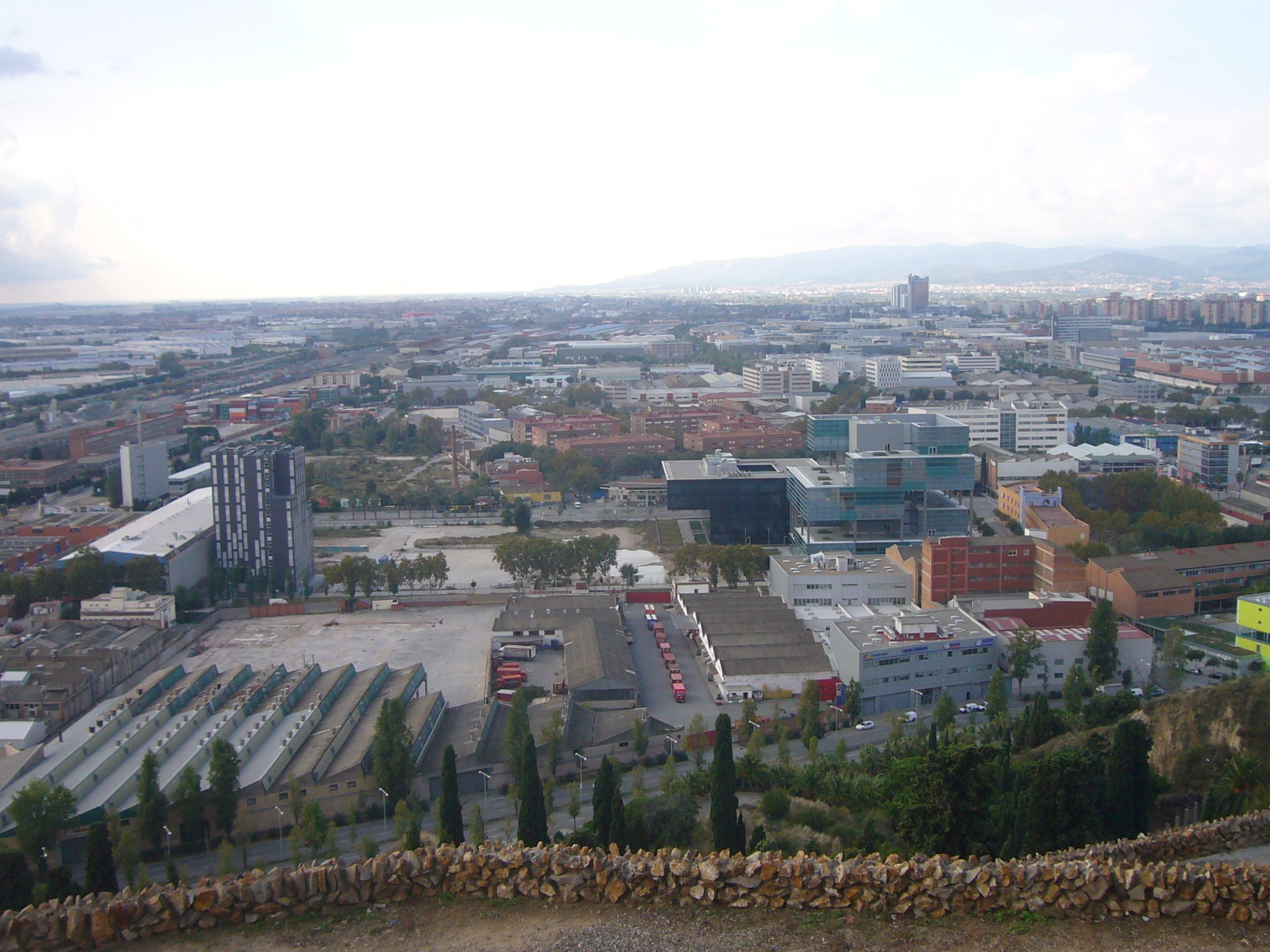
View of La Marina del Prat Vermell of the La Marina de Sants, Barcelona

La Marina de Sants (or la Marina) is an area of the district of Sants-Montjuïc, Barcelona. This area is divided into two neighborhoods: the lower la Marina de Port and the higher, la Marina del Prat Vermell.
