= Dellafuente =

- Dellafuente in 2017

Background information
- Also known as: El Chino
- Born: Pablo Enoc Bayo Ruiz; 1991 (age 34–35); Granada, Spain
- Origin: Armilla, Spain
- Genres: Trap, flamenco
- Instrument: Vocals
- Years active: 2015–present

Pablo Enoc Bayo Ruiz (born 1991), (Note: A majority of sources list 1991 as Dellafuente's year of birth, including El Mundo, Ideal, GQ, and 20 minutos. Sources for 1992 include El Comercio. Journalist Isabel Vargas in Granada Hoy has reported his year of birth alternatively as 1991, and 1992.) known as Dellafuente, is a Spanish singer and rapper. His music combines elements of trap and flamenco. He released his first album, Azulejos de corales, in 2015, and has had three albums in the top 10 of the Spanish Albums Chart. "Manos rotas", his collaboration with Morad, topped the Spanish Singles Chart for six weeks between 2023 and 2024.

== Early life ==
Dellafuente was born in Granada and raised in nearby Armilla, specifically in its Corea neighbourhood, where he is known as "El Chino". His mother is Brazilian, and he took his artistic name from his paternal grandmother's surname, De la Fuente. He did automotive training, and failed an audiovisual course due to absences; he worked fixing motorcycles and in his father's wardrobe shop.

== Musical career ==
After building up a following on social media, Dellafuente released his first studio album, Azulejos de corales, in December 2015. His second album, Ansia viva, followed in September 2016. In December 2017, he and C. Tangana released the collaborative single "Guerrera", which peaked at number 17 on the Spanish Singles Chart and spent 36 weeks in the top 100. In February 2019, the song "París" was released by the pair and Alizzz, peaking at number 10.

In June 2020, Dellafuente's third album, Descanso en poder was released, followed in each of the following years by the extended plays Milagro and Tanteo. His fourth studio album, Lágrimas pa otro día, charted at number 5 in May 2023. Dellafuente and Morad released the single "Manos rotas" at the end of November 2023; the song went to number one for six weeks, and remained in the top 100 for 67 weeks. The pair released a six-track EP, Zizou, to promote their appearances at Red Bull Soundclash in Madrid on 12 and 13 December.

Dellafuente released the album Torii Yama in June 2024, which went to number two. He broke a five-year media silence to give an interview to El Mundo, in which he announced a concert at Real Madrid's Santiago Bernabeu Stadium, which was then moved to Atlético Madrid's Metropolitano Stadium and held for two nights in June 2025. The 360-degree stage in the centre was designed in the shape of an eight-pointed star, popular in the architecture of his native Andalusia. The two shows brought a total of 117,630 spectators, making him the Spanish artist with the highest average ticket sales in 2025; they required 2,800 workers and brought €35 million to the city of Madrid. In June 2026, he released the album Brigado, featuring the alter ego 3NOC as a credited guest artist; it reached a peak of number 4 in its first week.

== Musical style ==
Dellafuente said that at 15, he listened to flamenco and reggaeton, as well as a smaller amount of rap, such as Mala Rodríguez. He said that he should not be referred to exclusively as a rapper or trapper, but as an "urban musical artist", which he said was a more common term in Latin America. His music is inspired by the flamenco culture of his city, and he has named assassinated Granada author Federico García Lorca as an influence. Dellafuente has defended his use of AutoTune, saying that he would be "dead from hunger" without it. He has been described as part of New flamenco.
