= Florida, Colorado =

Unincorporated community in La Plata County, Colorado, United States

- Unincorporated community
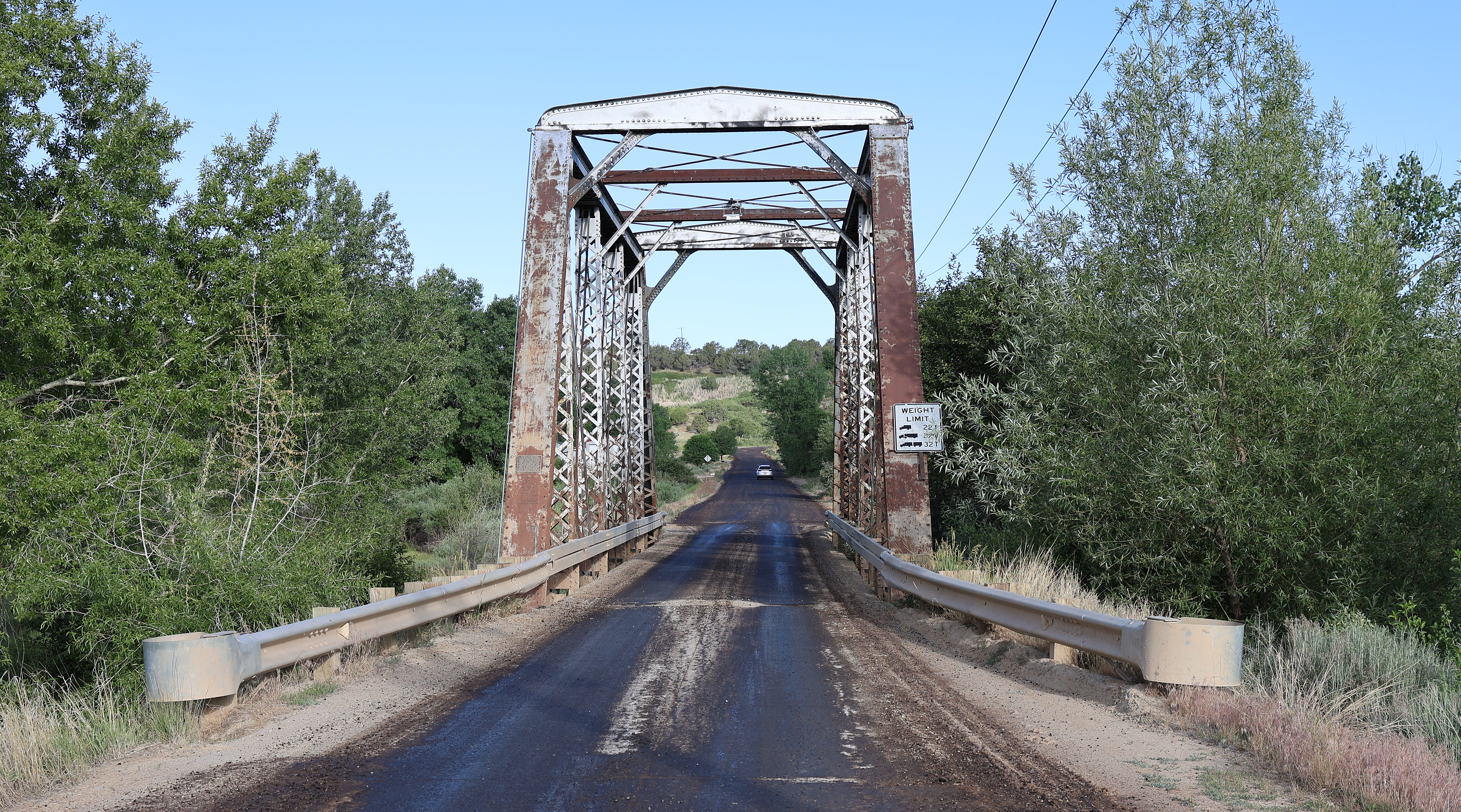
- The 1887 Denver and Rio Grande Western Railroad bridge over the Florida River in Florida. The bridge was converted to a road bridge.

- Location of Florida, Colorado. Florida (Colorado)
- Coordinates: 37°12′54″N 107°45′03″W
- Country: United States
- State: Colorado
- County: La Plata

Government
  - Type: Unincorporated community
  - Body: La Plata County
- Elevation: 6,729 ft (2,051 m)
- Time zone: UTC−07:00 (MST)
  - Summer (DST): UTC−06:00 (MDT)
- ZIP code: 81120
- Area codes: 970/748
- GNIS place ID: 202998

Florida is an unincorporated community located in and governed by La Plata County, Colorado, United States. Florida is a part of the Durango, CO Micropolitan Statistical Area.

== History ==
The Florida, Colorado, post office operated from August 8, 1877, until March 31, 1881. The Antonito, Colorado, post office (ZIP code 81120) now serves the area. The community takes its name from the nearby Florida River.

== Geography ==
Florida is located in eastern La Plata County.

== See also ==
- Durango, CO Micropolitan Statistical Area
