= Lake Florida =

Lake in the state of Minnesota, United States

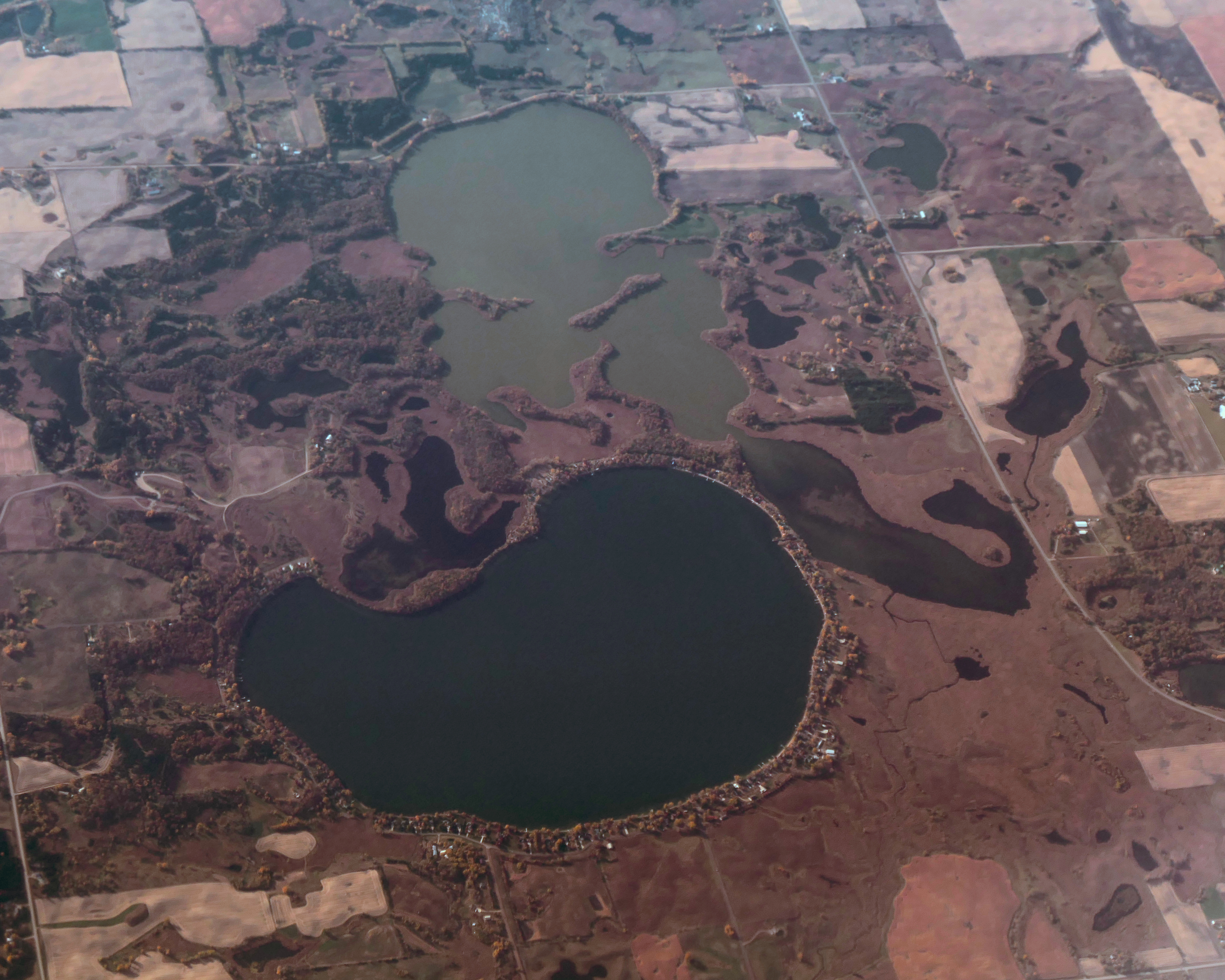

- Location within Minnesota
- Location: Kandiyohi County, Minnesota
- Coordinates: 45°15′8″N 95°3′25″W
- Type: lake

Lake Florida is a lake in Kandiyohi County, in the U.S. state of Minnesota.

According to Warren Upham, Lake Florida was said to have been named by early settlers for its "location to the south".

== See also ==
- List of lakes in Minnesota
