= Renaissance Barcelona Fira Hotel =

Hotel in Spain

Coordinates: 41.3555°N 2.1250°E

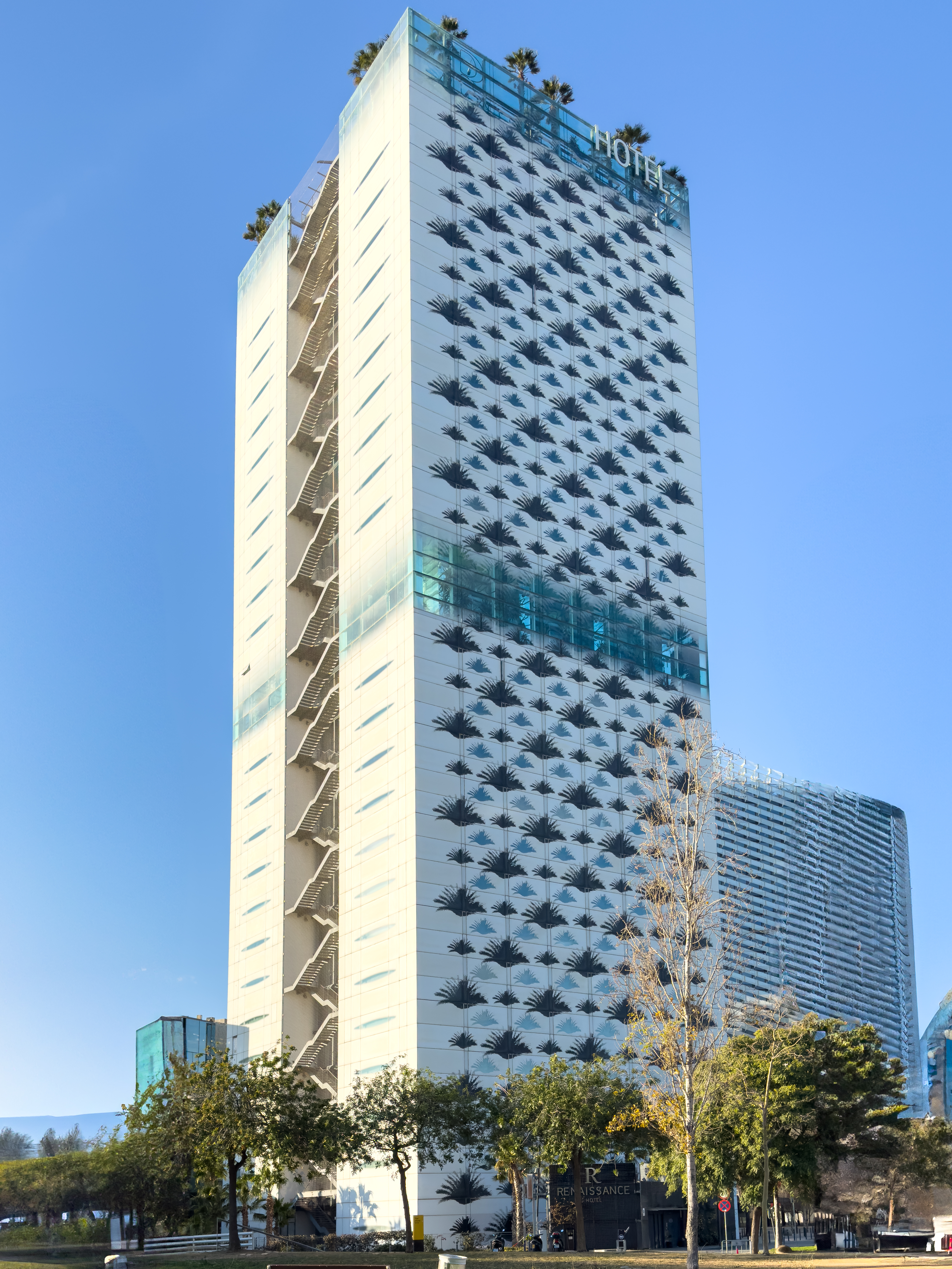
- Interactive map of the Renaissance Barcelona Fira Hotel area

General information
- Status: Completed
- Type: hotel
- Location: L'Hospitalet de Llobregat (suburb of Barcelona), Spain
- Completed: 2011

Height
- Height: 105 m (344 ft)

Technical details
- Floor count: 26

Design and construction
- Architect: Jean Nouvel

Renaissance Barcelona Fira Hotel, previously Hotel Catalonia Plaza Europa, is a skyscraper and hotel in L'Hospitalet de Llobregat (suburb of Barcelona), Catalonia, Spain. Completed in 2011, has 26 floors and rises 105 metres. Lies on the Plaça d'Europa 50. It is part of the Renaissance Hotels group.

== See also ==
- List of tallest buildings and structures in Barcelona
