= Florida, Vologda Oblast =

Florida Флорида
- Village
- Location within Vologda Oblast Location within Russia
- Coordinates: 59°21′N 38°30′E
- Country: Russia
- Region: Vologda Oblast
- District: Sheksninsky District
- Time zone: UTC+3:00

Florida (Russian: Флорида) is a rural locality (a village) in Sizemskoye Settlement, Sheksninsky District, Vologda Oblast, Russia. The population was 1 as of 2002.

== Geography ==
Florida is located 36 km north of Sheksna (the district's administrative centre) by road. Pyzheyevo is the nearest locality. It has nothing to do with the U.S. state.
