= La Marina de Port =

Coordinates: 41°21′34.5″N 2°8′27.5″E

- Neighborhood of Barcelona
- Interactive map of La Marina de Port
- Country: Spain
- Autonomous community: Catalonia
- Province: Barcelona
- Comarca: Barcelonès
- Municipality: Barcelona
- District: Sants-Montjuïc

Area
  - Total: 1.255 km^{2} (0.485 sq mi)

Population
  - Total: 30,397
  - Density: 24,220/km^{2} (62,730/sq mi)

La Marina de Port is a neighborhood in the Sants-Montjuïc district of Barcelona, Catalonia (Spain), and is one of the two parts of la Marina de Sants. It lies between the districts of la Bordeta, la Marina del Prat Vermell (also in la Marina de Sants).
