= La Marina del Prat Vermell =

Coordinates: 41°21′7.57″N 2°8′21.97″E

- Neighborhood of Barcelona
- Interactive map of La Marina del Prat Vermell
- Country: Spain
- Autonomous community: Catalonia
- Province: Barcelona
- Comarca: Barcelonès
- Municipality: Barcelona
- District: Sants-Montjuïc

Area
  - Total: 14.284 km^{2} (5.515 sq mi)

Population
  - Total: 2,159
  - Density: 151.1/km^{2} (391.5/sq mi)

La Marina del Prat Vermell is a neighborhood in the Sants-Montjuïc district of Barcelona, Catalonia (Spain). The name comes from fields that occupied this area of low part of la Marina de Sants. This is a new neighborhood that is developing between the other sector of la Marina de Sants, la Marina de Port, and the industrial area of Zona Franca.

The new center will have about 30,000 people and occupy about 80 hectares of land which are industrial. The accessibility to the district will be guaranteed once they have completed the construction of Barcelona Metro line 9.
