= Torre Werfen =

Skyscraper in Spain

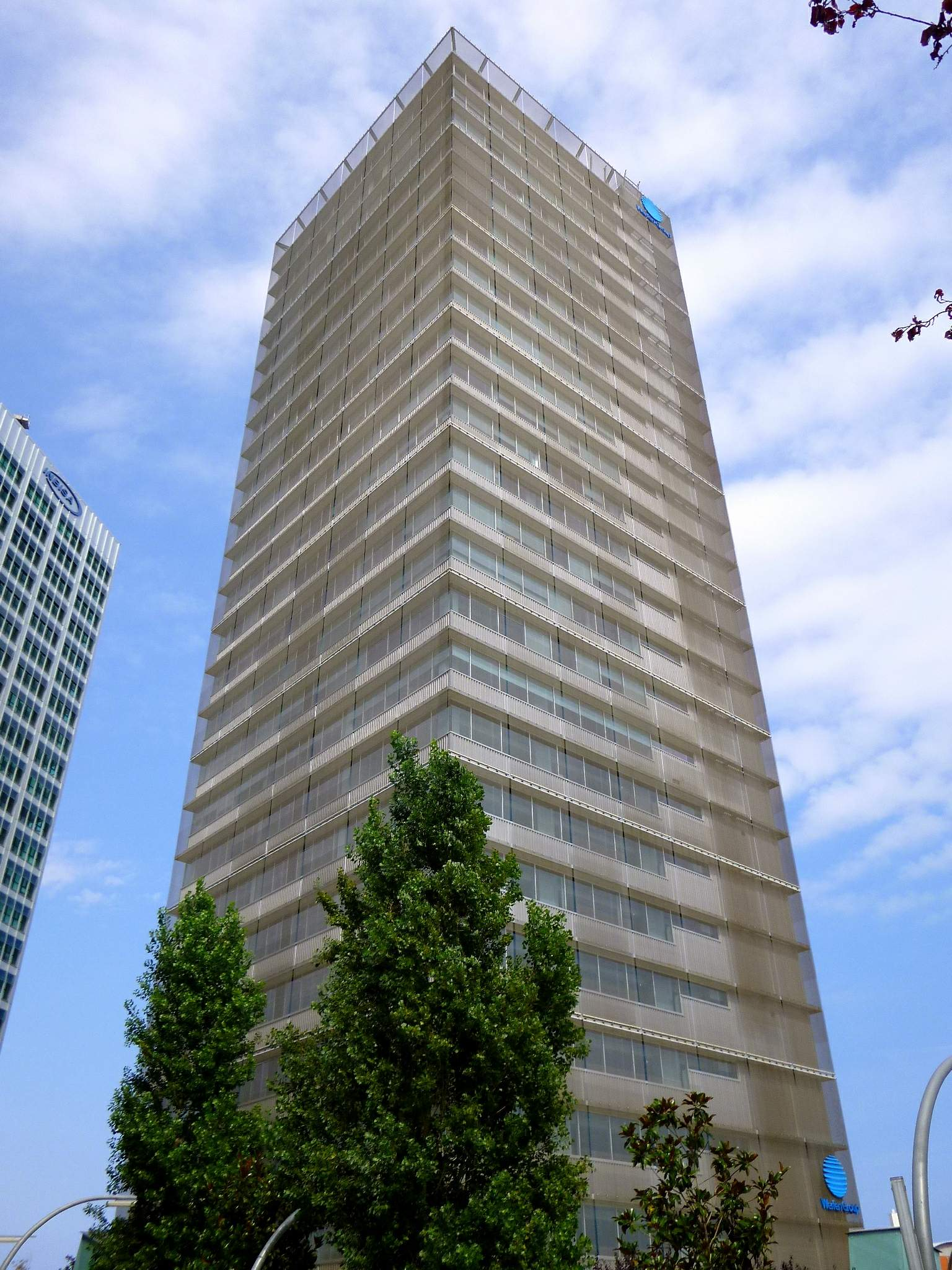
- Torre Werfen
- Interactive map of the Torre Werfen area

General information
- Status: Completed
- Type: office
- Location: L'Hospitalet de Llobregat, suburg of Barcelona, Spain
- Coordinates: 41°21′32″N 2°5′57.9″E
- Construction started: 2005
- Completed: 2009

Height
- Height: 107 m (351 ft)

Technical details
- Floor count: 25
- Floor area: 24,858 m^{2} (267,570 sq ft)

Torre Werfen ("Werfen Tower") (also named Torre Zenit, Torre Banif, and Torre Europa 2) is a skyscraper in L'Hospitalet de Llobregat (suburb of Barcelona), Catalonia, Spain.

Completed in 2009, the building has 25 floors and rises 107 meters.

The tower is on the Plaza de Europa 21. It is the head office of the Werfen Group, a medical equipment company.

== See also ==
- List of tallest buildings and structures in Barcelona
