= USS Florida =

Several United States Navy ships have borne the name Florida, in honor of the state of Florida:

- Florida (1824) was a sloop that served on survey duty between 1824 and 1831. Her final cruise, between 1 June 1830 and 31 May 1831, was under the command of Lieutenant T. R. Gedney.
- Florida (1834) was a steamboat built in Savannah, Georgia, and operated on the St. Johns River during the Second Seminole War. It was 104 feet (32 m) long with a beam of 7 feet 4 inches (2.24 m) and displaced near 144 tons.
- USS Florida (1850) was a side-wheel steamboat purchased in 1861 and sold after 1867.
- USS Florida (1869) was originally the screw frigate USS Wampanoag, renamed in 1869, and sold in 1885.
- USS Florida (BM-9) was an Arkansas-class monitor commissioned in 1903, renamed to USS Tallahassee in 1908, redesignated as IX-16 in 1921 and decommissioned and sold in 1922.
- USS Florida (BB-30) was the lead ship of her class of battleship, commissioned 1911 and scrapped in 1932.
- USS Florida (SSGN-728) is an Ohio-class cruise missile submarine, originally commissioned in 1983 as a ballistic missile submarine designated SSBN-728.

== See also ==
- CSS Florida
- SS Florida
- USS Floridian (ID-3875)
