= Torre Inbisa =

Skyscraper in Spain

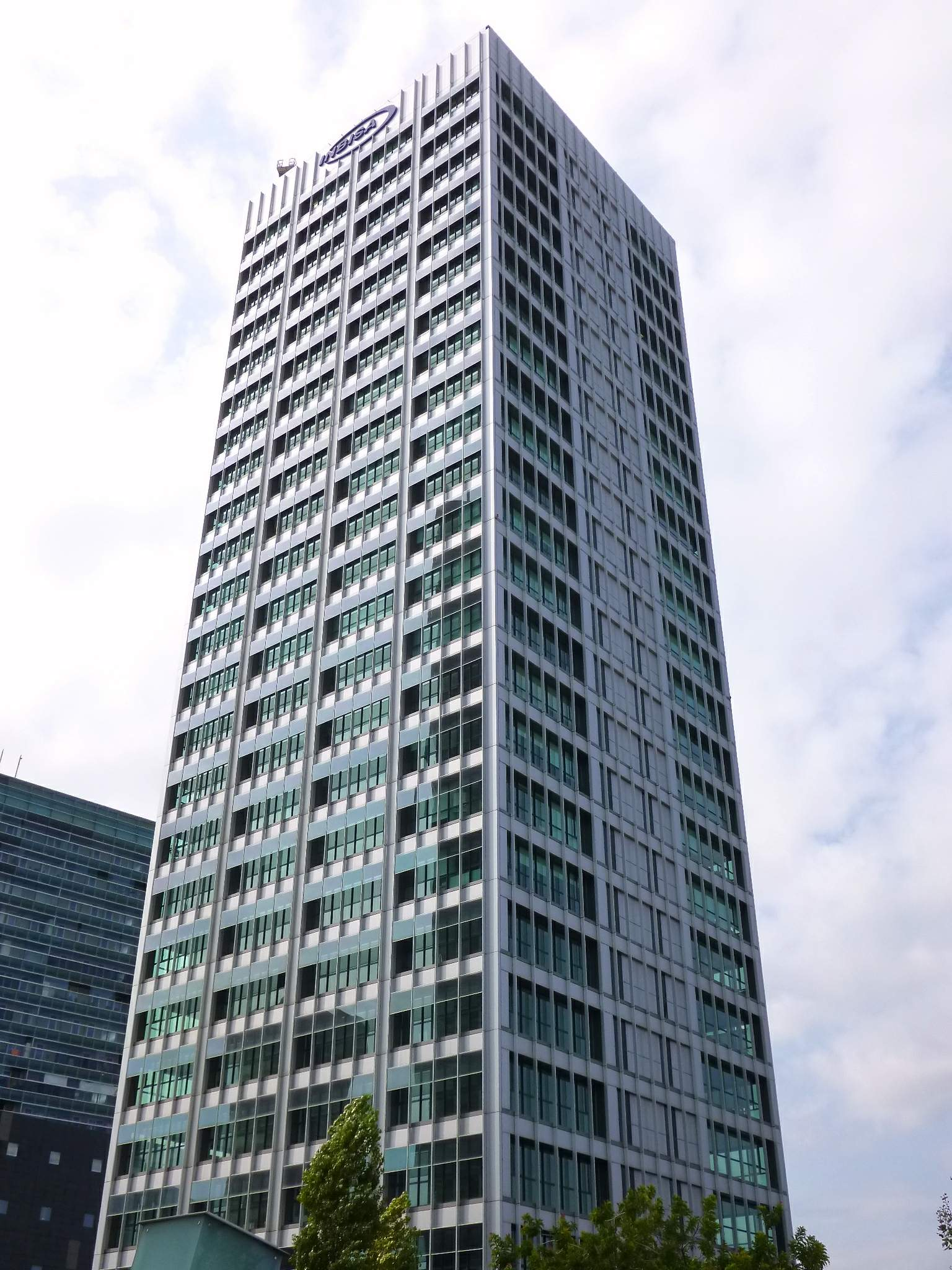
- Interactive map of the Torre Inbisa area

General information
- Status: Completed
- Type: Office
- Location: L'Hospitalet de Llobregat (suburb of Barcelona), Spain
- Coordinates: 41.3571°N 2.1278°E
- Construction started: 2006
- Completed: 2010

Height
- Height: 104 m (341 ft)

Technical details
- Floor count: 25
- Floor area: 25,207 m^{2} (271,330 sq ft)

Torre Inbisa is a skyscraper in L'Hospitalet de Llobregat (suburb of Barcelona, Catalonia), Spain. It is named after its owner, Inbisa, a real state and construction company. Completed in 2010, has 25 floors and rises 104 metres (341 ft). It is on the Plaça d'Europa 9. It was designed by Nicanor García Architecture.

== See also ==
- List of tallest buildings and structures in Barcelona
