= L'Hospitalet de Llobregat =

L'Hospitalet de Llobregat Hospitalet de Llobregat
- Municipality
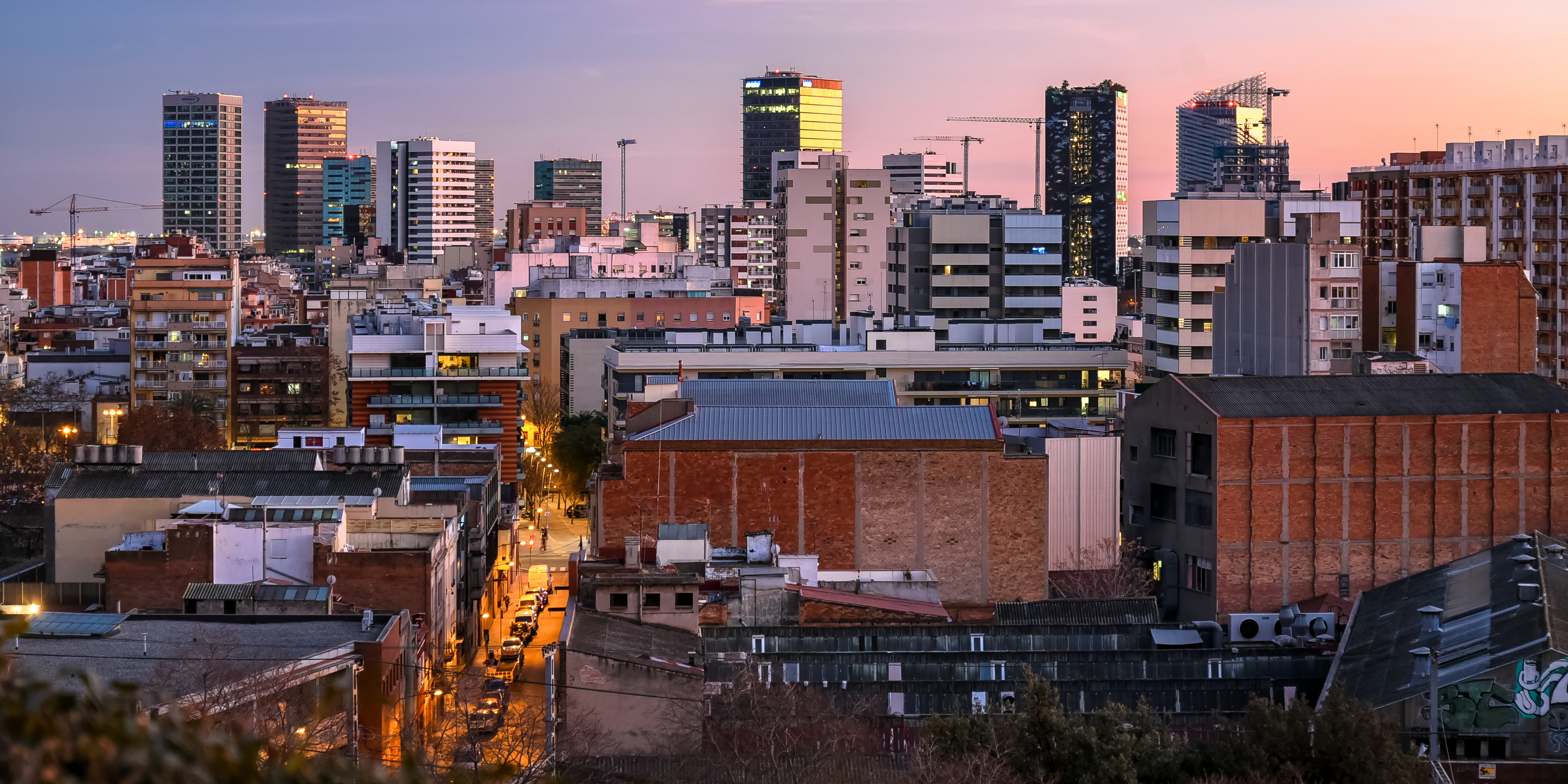

- Flag Coat of arms

- Location in Barcelonès county
- Interactive map of L'Hospitalet de Llobregat
- Location within Catalonia Location within Spain
- Coordinates: 41°21′35″N 2°6′00″E
- Country: Spain
- Autonomous community: Catalonia
- Region: Barcelona
- County: Barcelonès
- Province: Barcelona
- Founded: 12th century

Government
  - Type: Ajuntament
  - Body: Ajuntament de L'Hospitalet
  - Mayor: David Quirós (2024) (PSC)

Area
  - Municipality: 13.60 km^{2} (5.25 sq mi)
- Elevation (AMSL): 8 m (26 ft)

Population (2025)
  - Municipality: 292,161
  - Rank: 15th in Spain
  - Density: 21,480/km^{2} (55,640/sq mi)
- Demonyms: hospitalenc, -ca (ca) hospitalense (es)
- Time zone: UTC+1 (CET)
  - Summer (DST): UTC+2 (CEST)
- Postal code: 0890x
- Dialing code: +34 (E) 93 (B)
- INE code: 08 1017
- City budget (2014): €200 million
- Main festitivity: ?
- Patron saint: Saint Eulalia
- Website: l-h.cat

L'Hospitalet de Llobregat, (Note: Pronunciation of L'Hospitalet de Llobregat (official): [luspitəˈlɛd də ʎuβɾəˈɣat]) known in Spanish as Hospitalet de Llobregat, (Note: Pronunciation of Hospitalet de Llobregat: [ospitaˈleð ðe ʎoβɾeˈɣat]) literally "The little Hospital of Llobregat", often shortened to L'Hospitalet or just L'H, is a city and municipality in the autonomous community of Catalonia in Spain. It is part of the Barcelona metropolitan area, the Barcelona province, the Barcelonès comarca and of the Barcelona conurbation. With a population of 292,161 as of 2025, it is the 15th-largest city in Spain and the 2nd-largest city in Catalonia. It is one of the most densely populated cities in the European Union.

== Etymology ==
The name of L'Hospitalet (literally, "The little Hospital" in Catalan) makes reference to a hostel. The name of the river Llobregat is added to differentiate it from other towns with the same name.

== History ==
The first records of the settlement date to the Neolithic era with artefacts showing human habitation in the Llobregat river area. Roman artefacts have been found dating to the 2nd century BC such as a funeral decoration representing the head of Medusa, now in the Archaeological Museum of Catalonia. However it is not until the 10th century that written references to Provençana (the city's original name) appear.

The place had about 5,000 inhabitants by the turn of the 20th century. Throughout the early 20th century, it consisted of three different urban settlements, Centre, Sta. Eulàlia and Collblanc. Local agricultural output and profitability experienced a peak in this period. A chunk of the municipality (900 ha) was lost to the municipality of Barcelona in 1920. L'Hospitalet then became a primarily industrial municipality, focused on textile, metalworking, ceramic and building materials industries.

The 1960s and 1970s saw a second population boom, caused by immigration from poorer regions of Spain: however this was not matched by construction of the necessary amenities and it was only in the 1990s that public investment resulted in additional schools, leisure facilities and housing.

== Geography ==
L'Hospitalet's surface is 12.40 km^{2} (4.79 sq mi). The area on which the city is constructed may be divided in two different geological areas. One of them follows the coast typology and is called La Marina, similarly to two coast areas of neighbouring Barcelona's Zona Franca: La Marina del Prat Vermell and La Marina de Port. The latter half of L'Hospitalet is called El Samontà, which consists of hills and a more elevated area.

== Demographics ==
As of 2025, the population is 292,161, of which 48.9% are males, and 51.1% are females. Minors make up 16.0% of the population, and seniors make up 18.7%.

Historical population

Year	Pop.	±%
1842	2,504	—
1857	3,072	+22.7%
1877	3,604	+17.3%
1887	4,148	+15.1%
1900	4,891	+17.9%
1910	6,226	+27.3%
1920	12,393	+99.1%
1930	33,567	+170.9%
1940	50,070	+49.2%

Year	Pop.	±%
1950	69,748	+39.3%
1960	121,995	+74.9%
1970	240,630	+97.2%
1981	295,074	+22.6%
1991	272,578	−7.6%
2001	239,019	−12.3%
2011	256,509	+7.3%
2021	265,003	+3.3%

Source: INE

=== Migration ===
As of 2025, immigrants make up 40.6% of the population. The 5 largest foreign countries of birth are Ecuador, Peru, Colombia, the Dominican Republic, and Bolivia. Another 43.3% of the population were born in Catalonia and 16.1% were born in the rest of Spain.

Foreign population by country of birth (2025)
Country	Population
Ecuador	13,624
Peru	11,967
Colombia	10,233
Dominican Republic	10,066
Bolivia	9,626
Morocco	8,255
Honduras	7,047
Pakistan	5,941
India	5,609
Venezuela	4,795
China	3,669
Argentina	2,965
Paraguay	2,631
Romania	1,357
Brazil	1,288

== Administrative units ==
=== District I ===
El Centre

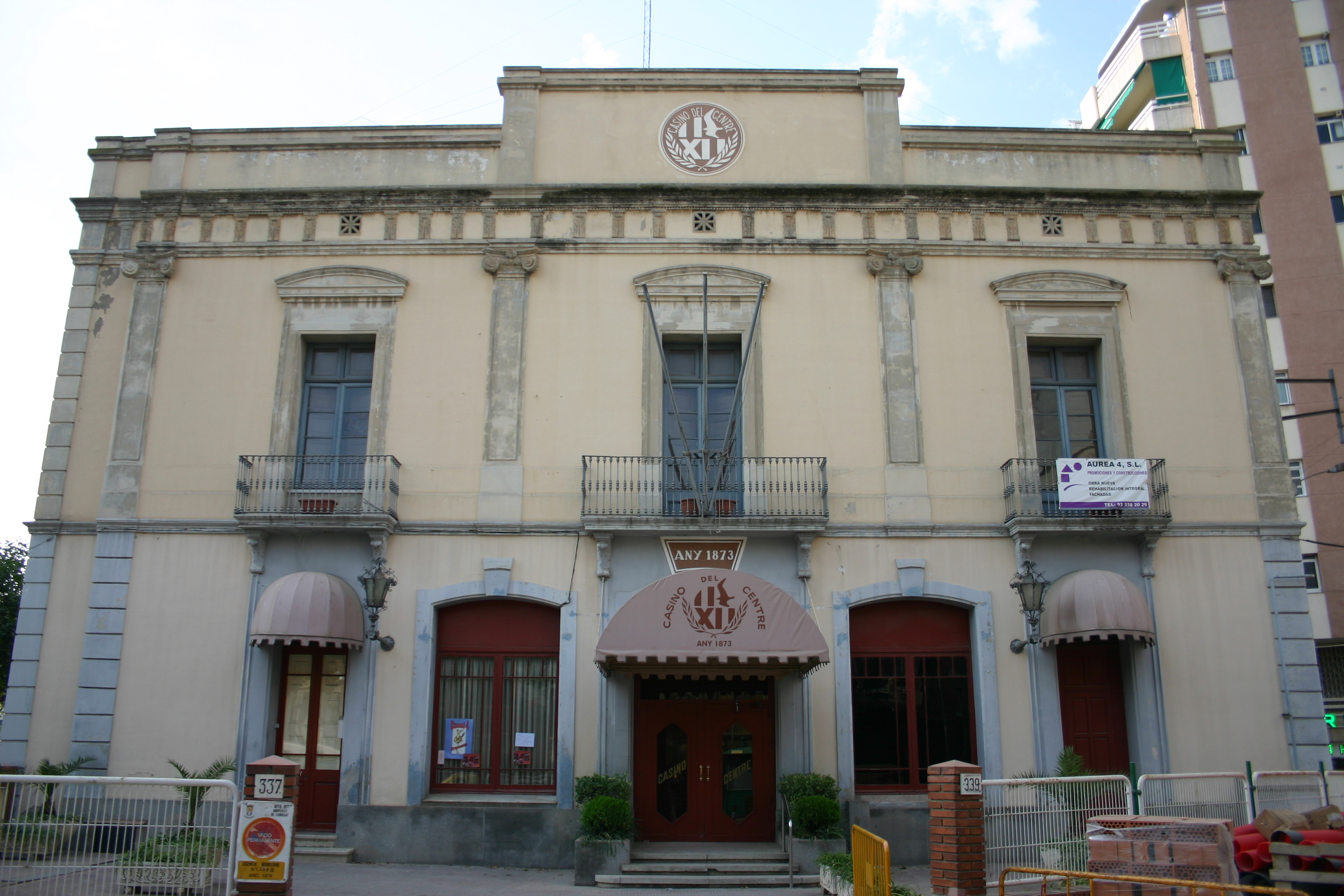
Casino del Centre

El Centre is the historical centre of the city, the oldest neighbourhood, where the City Council is, as well as the centre of activities such as La Farga and many of the cultural buildings, such as the History Museum, the Can Sumarro library, the cultural centre Barradas or the Sala Alexandre Cirici. It borders the district of Sanfeliu and Can Serra to the north, Bellvitge to the south, Sant Josep to the east, and the city of Cornellà de Llobregat to the west.

Sant Josep

Sant Josep remains framed by the square that is formed by the avenue of the Fabregada and that of Isabella The Catholic (Isabel la Catòlica) to the west, the Torrent Gornal to the east, the railroad on the north side Carrilet to the south. In this area, all the industrial activities that Hospitalet had through the ages left their mark: from the flour mills and the distilleries, up to the different energetic exploitation of the waterfalls of the Canal de la Infanta or the ceramic, textile, metallurgical and chemical industries. In fact, Sant Josep was originally an industrial suburb, but the subsequent disappearance of many factories, as well as the population increase, have given it a residential character.

Sanfeliu

Civic life in this quarter centres on the avenue of the Cirerers and the Communities Square (Plaça de les Comunitats). This public space is the scene of the greatest holiday celebrations, such as the festival of Sant Joan, the Carnival, and many other popular events. The cultural centre is also at the heart of many of the activities.

=== District II ===
Collblanc

This ward has a marked commercial character, centred near the Collblanc Metro stop. The Market Square (Plaça del Mercat) and the surroundings are the main centre of cultural life.

La Torrassa

Its origins has been linked to Collblanc. Today, the Spanish Square (Plaça Espanyola) and the new park of La Torrassa are at the heart of this neighbourhood and is where the holiday celebrations at the beginning of every summer are largest.

=== District III ===
Santa Eulàlia

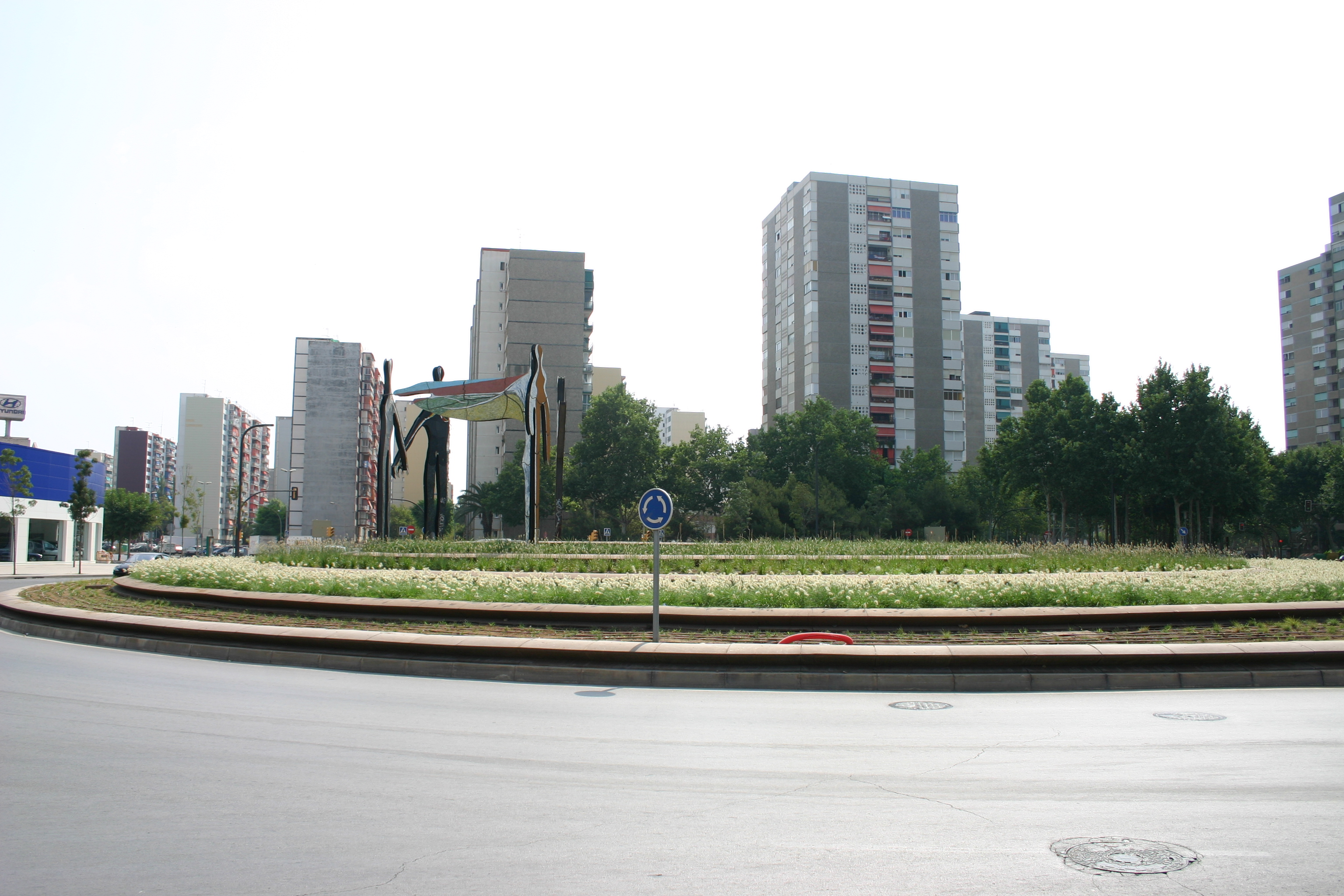
Rotonda

Its origins are dated back to Medieval times thanks to the presence of the Santa Eulàlia de Provençana hermitage (dated in the 12th century thanks to an inscription in the façade). Also it was very important during the Industrial Revolution thanks to the presence of many industries in the quarter, such as Can Trinxet, L'Aprestadora or Can Pareto.

Gran Via Sud

It is the smallest quarter in the town.

=== District IV ===
La Florida

La Florida is a majority-immigrant neighborhood that is the densest neighborhood in Europe.

Les Planes

=== District V ===
Pubilla Casas
Can Serra

=== District VI ===
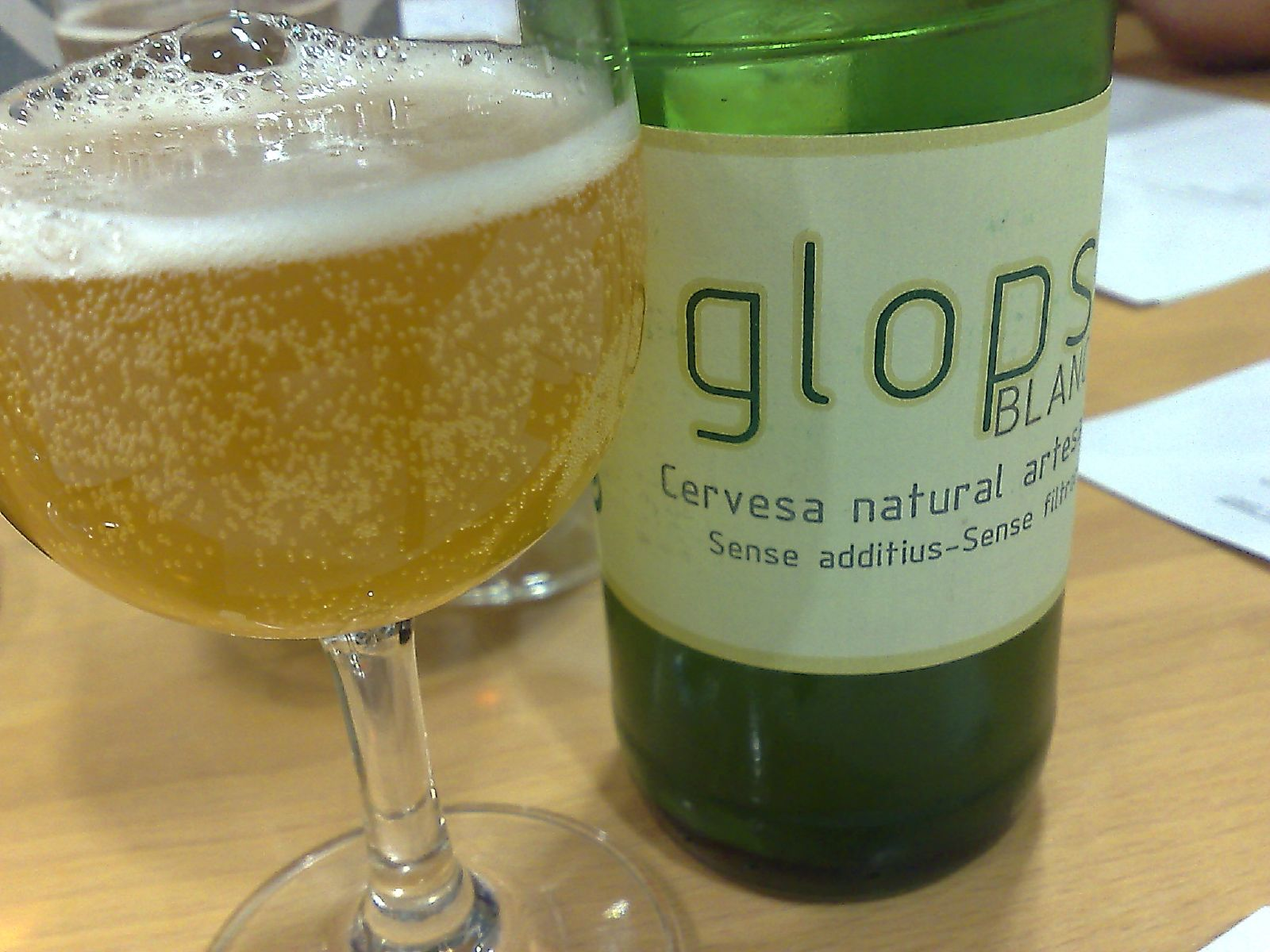
Craft beer of L'Hospitalet

Bellvitge

In 1964 the Inmobiliaria Ciudad Condal S.A. (ICC) company initiated the construction of this neighbourhood as it stands nowadays, beside the hermitage, on land which had been bought from local farmers. It was designed as a residential area to house the large number of immigrants who came to Catalonia from elsewhere in Spain – more than 126,000 people in 1964 – in search of work.

Gornal

=== District VII ===
Granvia l'Hospitalet

== Economy ==
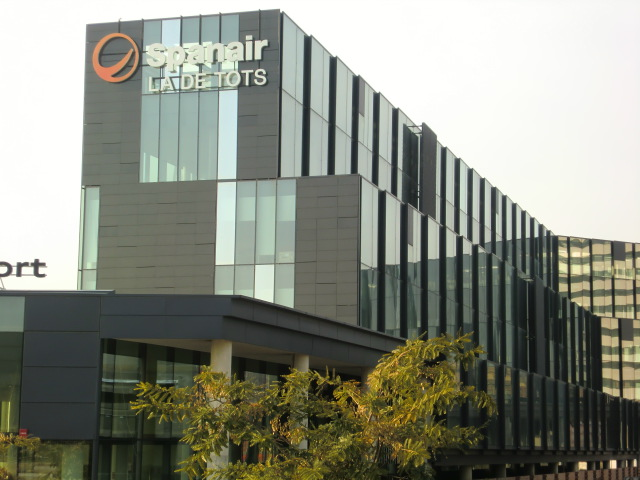
Spanair head office in L'Hospitalet de Llobregat

The city's reputation is largely still that of a depressed suburb, drawing on its proletarian origins and its reliance on Barcelona. But its economy has improved recently, as can be seen from the city's new skyline and relocation of companies to the city's new financial centre. Urban regeneration and construction took place during the 2000s, as well as ongoing work on improving public transportation in the second municipality of the Barcelona metropolitan area. The former airline Spanair's headquarters were in L'Hospitalet. Former mayor Celestino Corbacho campaigned to improve the city's infrastructure from his position in the Ministry of Work.

== Skyscrapers ==
- Hotel Porta Fira (2010) – 113 metres (371 ft)– Completed
- Torre Realia BCN (2009) – 112 metres (367 ft) – Completed
- Hotel Catalonia Plaza Europa (2011) – 105 metres (344 ft) – Completed
- Hesperia Tower (2006) – 106 metres (348 ft) – Completed
- Tower Caixa Catalunya (?) – 106 metres (348 ft) – Planned
- Torre Inbisa (2010) – 104 metres (341 ft) – Completed
- Torre Zenit (2009) – 104 metres (341 ft) – Completed
- Hospital de Bellvitge (1972) – 82 metres (269 ft) – Completed
- Tower Colonial (?) – 75 metres (246 ft) – Under Construction (on hold)
- Tower Fadesa I (2009) – 65 metres (213 ft) – Completed
- Tower Fadesa II (2009) – 65 metres (213 ft) – Completed
- Tower Fadesa III (2009) – 65 metres (213 ft) – Completed
- City Judicial Building A (2008) – 62 metres (203 ft) – Completed
- City Judicial Building C (2008) – 58 metres (190 ft) – Completed
- Torre Melina (Hotel Rey Juan Carlos) (1992) – 60 metres (200 ft) – Completed
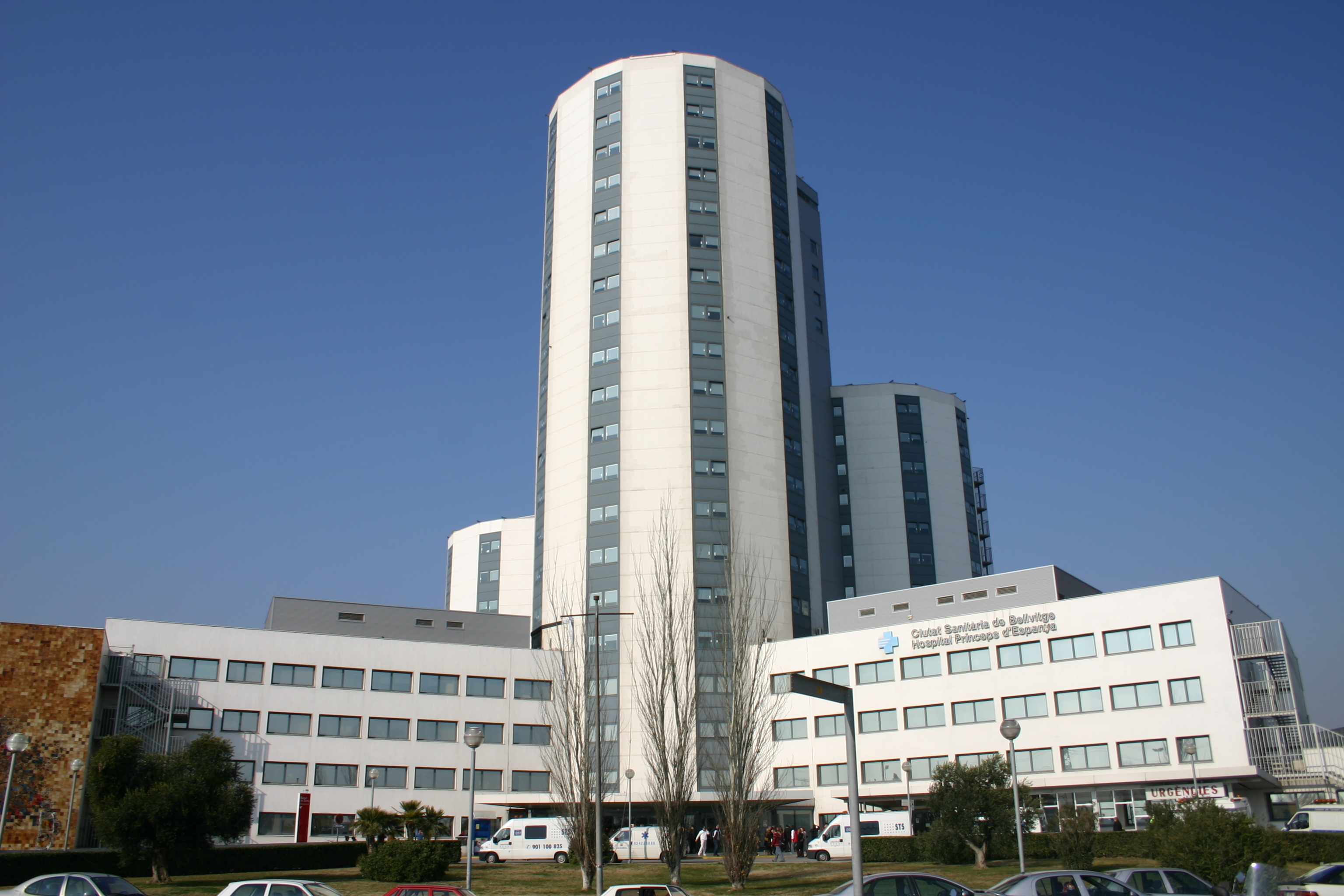
Hospital de Bellvitge

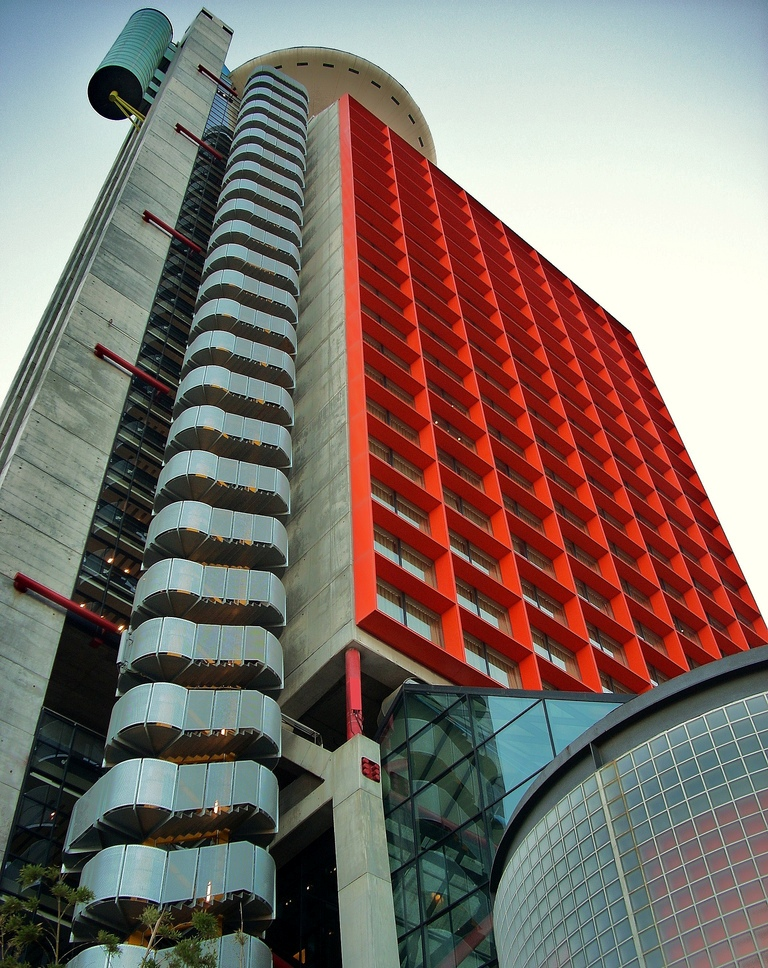
Hesperia Tower

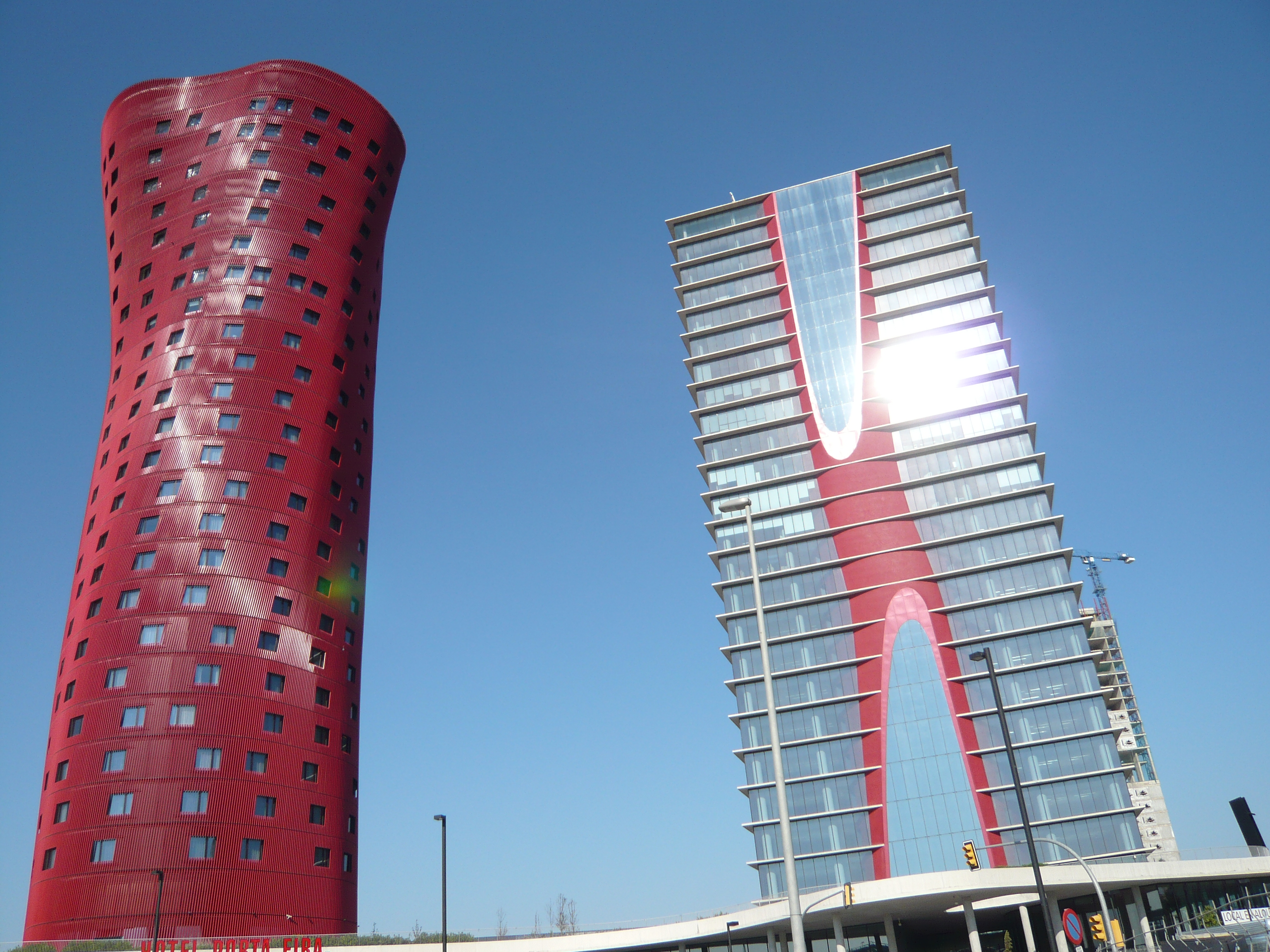
Toyo Ito Towers

== International relations ==
=== Twin towns – sister cities ===
L'Hospitalet is twinned with the following cities:

- Bayonne, France
- Tuzla, Bosnia and Herzegovina

== See also ==
- Metropolitan area of Barcelona
- Zona Franca (Barcelona)
