= CSS Florida =

At least three ships of the Confederate States Navy were named CSS Florida in honor of the third Confederate state:

- The blockade runner CSS Florida (blockade runner) was commissioned in January 1862, captured by the U.S. Navy in April 1862, and became USS Hendrick Hudson
- The cruiser CSS Florida (cruiser) was commissioned in August 1862 and captured by the U.S. Navy while in port in Bahia, Brazil in October 1864
- The gunboat CSS Selma was named CSS Florida prior to July 1862.

== See also ==
- USS Florida
