= Florida, Cochrane District =

Florida
- dispersed rural community
- Location in Ontario Florida (Canada)
- Coordinates: 49°06′09″N 80°50′39″W
- Country: Canada
- Province: Ontario
- District: Cochrane
- Part: Unorganized, North
- Township: Kennedy
- Elevation: 280 m (920 ft)
- Time zone: UTC-5 (Eastern Time Zone)
  - Summer (DST): UTC-4 (Eastern Time Zone)
- Postal Code: P0L 1C0
- Area codes: 705, 249
- GNBC Code: FBEMG

Florida is an dispersed rural community in Kennedy Township, Unorganized North Part of Cochrane District, Ontario, Canada. It is on the Sucker River, a right tributary of the Abitibi River.

== History ==
Florida had a post office from 1927 to 1931, and from 1936 to 1942.

A chapter of the Federated Women's Institutes of Ontario was located in Florida from 1939 to 1945.
