= Plaça d'Europa =

Area in Barcelona, Spain

Coordinates: 41.357049°N 2.124813°E

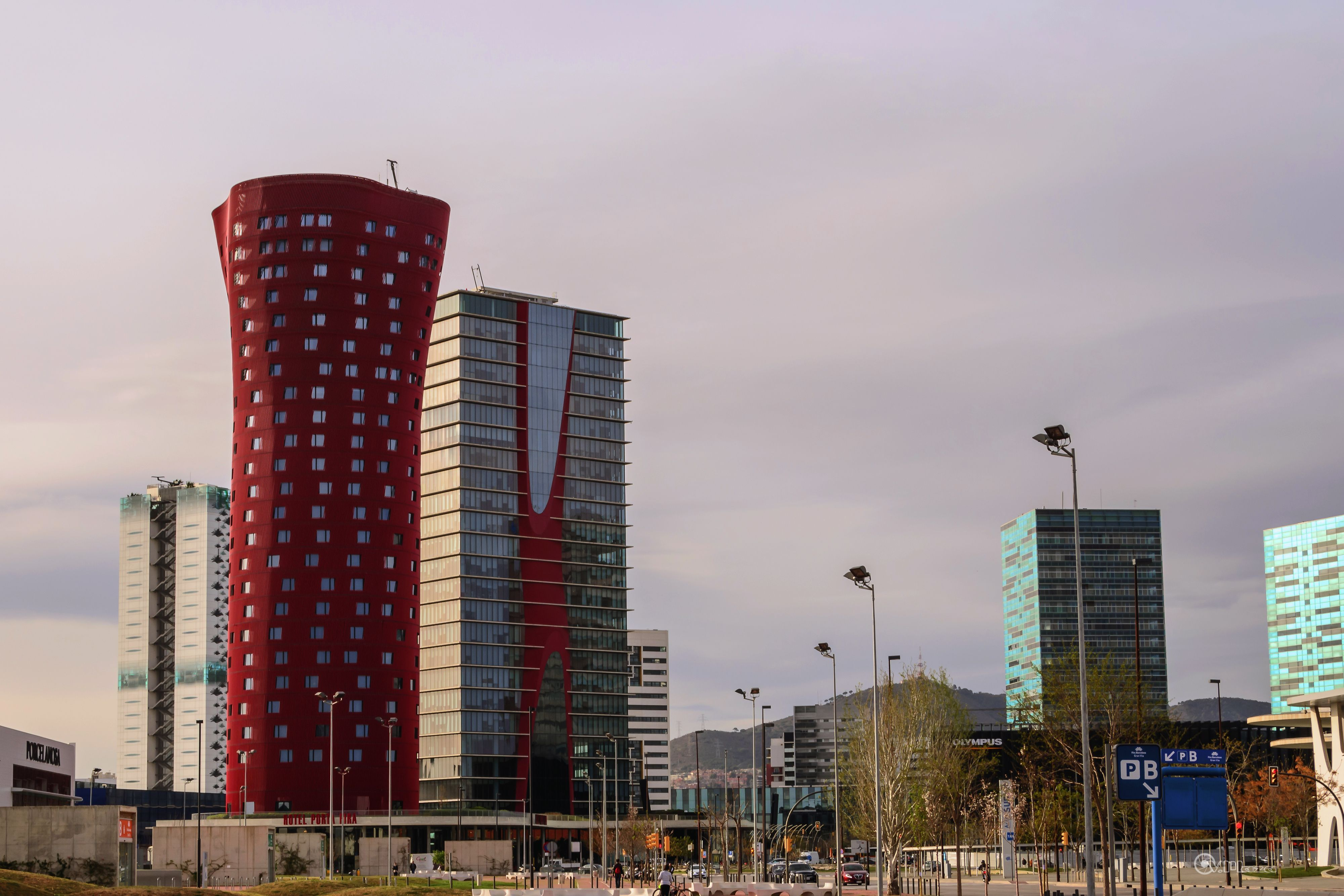
Overview of the square's buildings in 2014

Plaça d'Europa (official name in Catalan) is a square in the District VII (Granvia l'Hospitalet) of L'Hospitalet de Llobregat suburb of Barcelona, Catalonia in Spain. Located on the Granvia de l'Hospitalet avenue at the intersection with Carrer d'Amadeu Torner. It is part of L'Hospitalet's recent urban development, and one of its biggest squares at 33 ha, with a distinguishable skyline made up of high-rises, among the tallest structures in the city, some of which are designed by the renowned architect Toyo Ito. It is expected to become its economic centre, and will allow different parts of the city formerly severed by the Granvia to become interconnected. It is still not completed but already featuring most of its planned buildings and infrastructure. Part of Fira de Barcelona, near it stand the pavilions of rest of Fira de Barcelona and the shopping centre Gran Via 2.

== Buildings ==
High-rise buildings (over 50 m or 20 floors) in the area include:

Name	Height	Floors	Year	Usage
Hotel Porta Fira	113 m	26	2010	Hotel
Torre Realia BCN	112 m	24	2009	Offices
Renaissance Barcelona Fira Hotel	105 m	26	2012	Hotel
Torre Inbisa	104 m	25	2010	Offices
Torre Werfen	104 m	25	2009	Offices
Torre Europa 5	74 m	19	2009	Residential
Torre Europa 4	74 m	19	2009	Residential
Torre Europa 3	74 m	19	2009	Residential

== Transport ==
=== Commuter and metro services ===
Europa-Fira is a Ferrocarrils de la Generalitat de Catalunya (FGC) station served by Barcelona Metro L8 and L9 and L10.

== See also ==
- Ciutat de la Justícia de Barcelona i l'Hospitalet de Llobregat
