= La Florida (park) =

Park in Spain

- Parque de la Florida
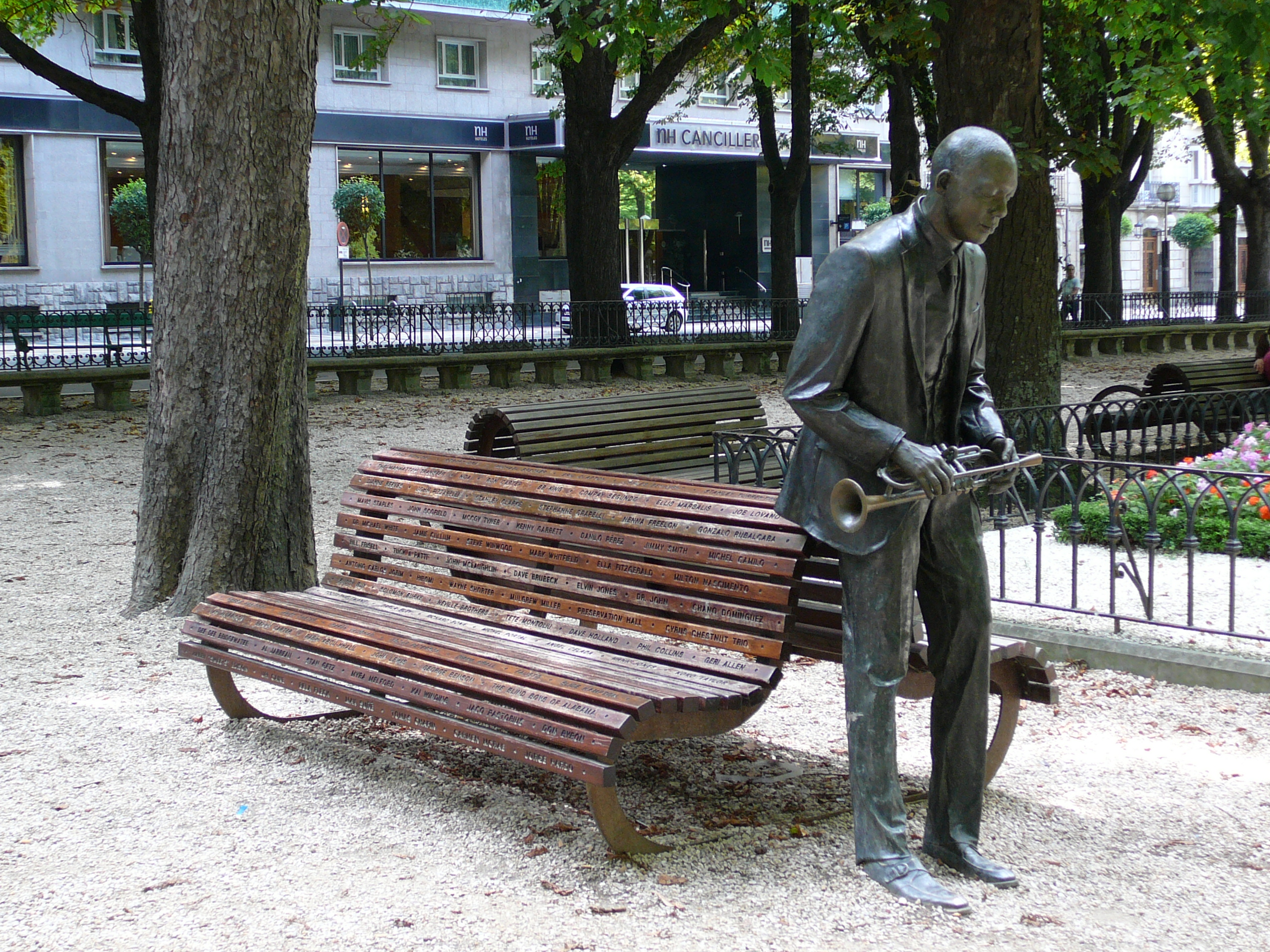
- Statue of trumpet player Wynton Marsalis

- Location within Álava Location within Spain
- Type: Urban park
- Location: Vitoria-Gasteiz, Álava, Spain
- Coordinates: 42.84361°N 2.67611°W
- Created: 1820
- Operator: city of Vitoria-Gasteiz

La Florida is a park in Vitoria-Gasteiz, Álava, Spain. It was built between 1820 and 1855 in neoclassical style by the architects Angel Chavez, Juan De Velasco, Ramón Ortés De Velasco and Manuel Arana. The birth of Florida is dated 1820 when they built the existing ring that surrounds the music kiosk. For the actual 32,454 square meters land used the former convent of Santa Clara, and as much as planners have insisted later, there is nothing similar in the new green spaces in Vitoria.

The park is oval and is crossed by two main roads that divide it into quadrants. The roads are perpendicular to each other and intersect in a large circle at the middle of this space. In this circular space is a metal kiosk built in 1890. Each of the squares of the area is bordered by low walls of carved sandstone, which also have small crossed rail-shaped arches.

== The bandstand ==
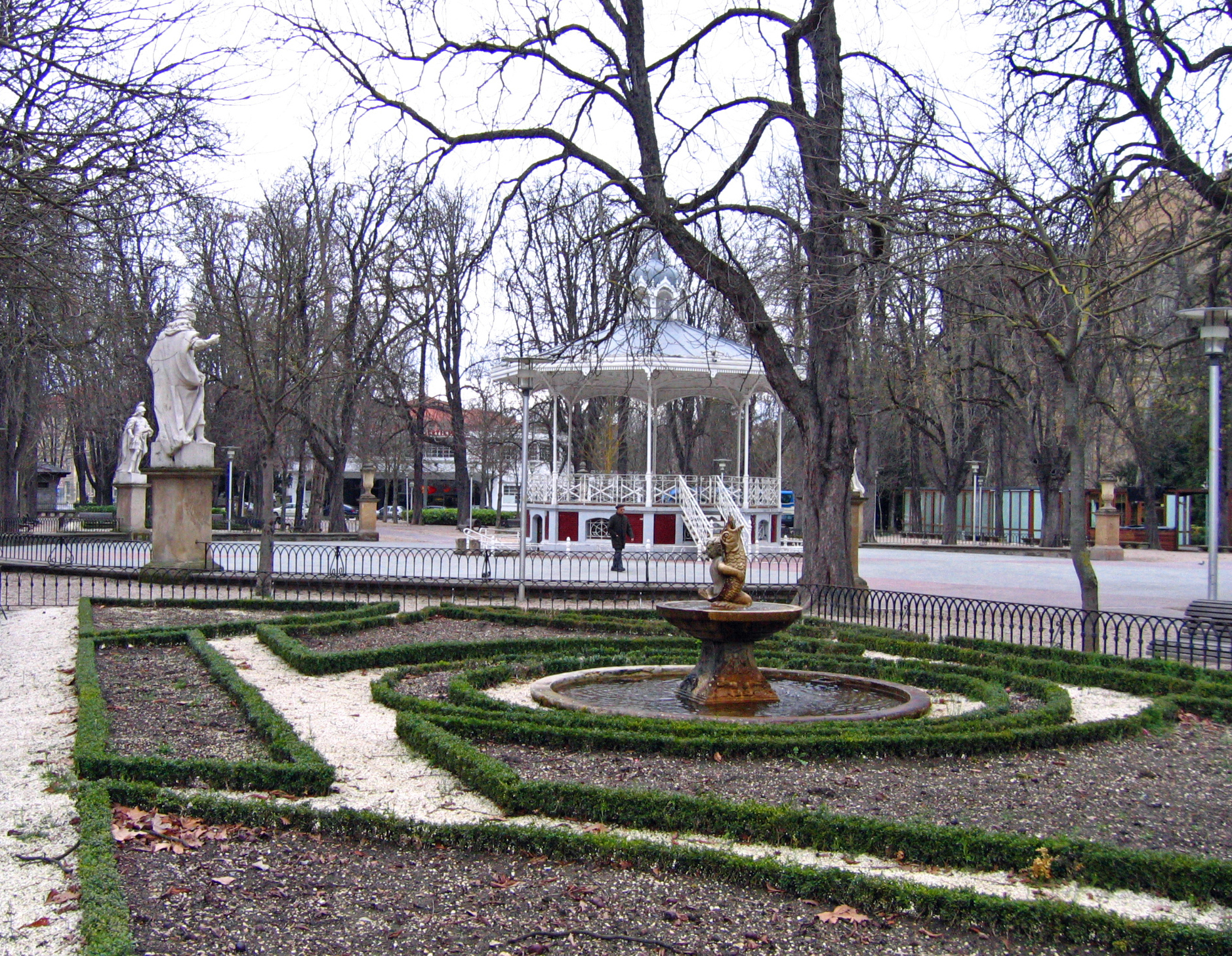
Bandstand

This bandstand was created in 1820 and renovated in 1855, located in center of the Florida park has witnessed the evolution of Vitoria through the years. Nowadays it has several functions, as spring arrives there are concerts which older people can enjoy ore in summer when the White Virgin's days are celebrated there are many activities as concerts or plays. The townhall used to put the ice rink in the bandstand at winter but, these year it has been moved to the White Virgin's square.

== The botanic garden ==
La Florida, in addition to being a privileged Vitoria lung and a place for meetings and appointments, keep a special representation of these giants that have achieved huge steps in an urban environment, something that makes them even more special . There are 90 different species of trees and 79 of different bushes . 40 of them are written the name, species and where they are coming from. This makes Florida an interesting botanic garden in which a lot of different plant species are collected.

== Statues ==
In this park of Vitoria there are many statues and sculptures.

- Wynton Learson Marsalis, Artistic Director of Jazz at Lincoln Center. His album Vitoria Suite, pays tribute to the city of Vitoria. Between 20 and July 22, 2009, Marsalis and Jazz at Lincoln Center Orchestra recorded in the great hall of the Conservatory Jesus Guridi the twelve movements of this suite. The American trumpet player with the collaboration of Paco de Lucia, Chano Domínguez and Javier Limón. Vitoria Suite combines jazz, flamenco and classical music. Because of this he has a statue in the center of the Florida and the thanks of every citizen of Vitoria-Gasteiz.
- José Ignacio de Aldecoa, the novelist, born in Vitoria-Gasteiz on 24 July 1925.

== Ignacio Aldecoa culture house ==
In La Florida there is a culture house where you can found displays, storytelling or another cultural exhibitions. There is also a library where you can rent books. It is called José Ignacio de Aldecoa because of the writer who was born in Vitoria-Gasteiz.

== See also ==
- Vitoria-Gasteiz
- Alava
- Green Belt of Vitoria-Gasteiz
