= Florida Township, Yellow Medicine County, Minnesota =

Florida Township, Minnesota
- Township
- Location within the state of Minnesota Florida Township, Minnesota (the United States)
- Coordinates: 44°45′7″N 96°23′28″W
- Country: United States
- State: Minnesota
- County: Yellow Medicine

Area
  - Total: 33.4 sq mi (86.5 km^{2})
  - Land: 33.4 sq mi (86.5 km^{2})
  - Water: 0 sq mi (0.0 km^{2})
- Elevation: 1,380 ft (420 m)

Population (2000)
  - Total: 164
  - Density: 4.9/sq mi (1.9/km^{2})
- Time zone: UTC-6 (Central (CST))
  - Summer (DST): UTC-5 (CDT)
- FIPS code: 27-21464
- GNIS feature ID: 0664182

Florida Township is a township in Yellow Medicine County, Minnesota, United States. The population was 164 at the 2000 census.

Florida Township was organized in 1879, and named for its Florida Creek.

== Geography ==
According to the United States Census Bureau, the township has a total area of 33.4 square miles (87 km^{2}), all land.

== Demographics ==
As of the census of 2000, there were 164 people, 55 households, and 43 families residing in the township. The population density was 4.9 inhabitants per square mile (1.9/km^{2}). There were 68 housing units at an average density of 2.0 per square mile (0.77/km^{2}). The racial makeup of the township was 100.00% White.

There were 55 households, out of which 36.4% had children under the age of 18 living with them, 76.4% were married couples living together, 1.8% had a female householder with no husband present, and 21.8% were non-families. 20.0% of all households were made up of individuals, and 3.6% had someone living alone who was 65 years of age or older. The average household size was 2.98 and the average family size was 3.49.

In the township the population was spread out, with 34.8% under the age of 18, 6.1% from 18 to 24, 24.4% from 25 to 44, 26.8% from 45 to 64, and 7.9% who were 65 years of age or older. The median age was 36 years. For every 100 females, there were 107.6 males. For every 100 females age 18 and over, there were 122.9 males.

The median income for a household in the township was $30,625, and the median income for a family was also $30,625. Males had a median income of $23,000 versus $14,375 for females. The per capita income for the township was $12,349. About 9.1% of families and 9.6% of the population were below the poverty line, including 7.0% of those under the age of eighteen and none of those 65 or over.
