= La Florida (L'Hospitalet de Llobregat) =

La Florida is a neighborhood in District 4 of L'Hospitalet de Llobregat, in the Barcelona metropolitan area. It borders the neighborhoods of Collblanc, Pubilla Cases, and Les Planes. Thanks to several waves of migration, most recently in the 2000s, La Florida is now the densest neighborhood in Europe and is majority foreign-born.

== History ==
In the 19th century, the neighborhood was mainly vineyards, but by the 1900s some light industry, specifically brickworks, appeared in the area. In 1921, Antoni Ceravalls, a local cooper who owned much of the land in the area, asked the local council to lay down what are now the arterial roads of the area: Carrer Ceravalls, Carrer Renclusa, Carrer de la Florida, and Carrer Sant Ramon.

In 1926, municipal architect Ramon Puig i Gairalt put forth a plan for the urbanization of the neighborhood, and by 1930 the city was laying down more streets. In contrast to later waves of development, the first houses in the area were self-built in small areas.

The first wave of growth came in the 1950s and 1960s, as part of a greater Spanish baby boom and wave of migration. In 1960 the neighborhood had 27,630 inhabitants, and in 1970 that number had almost doubled to 53,364. Since then, the population of the neighborhood fell gradually, and by 2020 the population was 28,821.

Starting in the 2000s, there was another wave of migration in Spain, and many immigrants settled in La Florida. Today, 50% of the residents are foreign-born, with the majority coming from Latin American countries, mainly Bolivia, Honduras, Peru, the Dominican Republic, Colombia, and Ecuador.
