= Paddock Bulevard =

Coordinates: 41.55347°N 2.09829°E

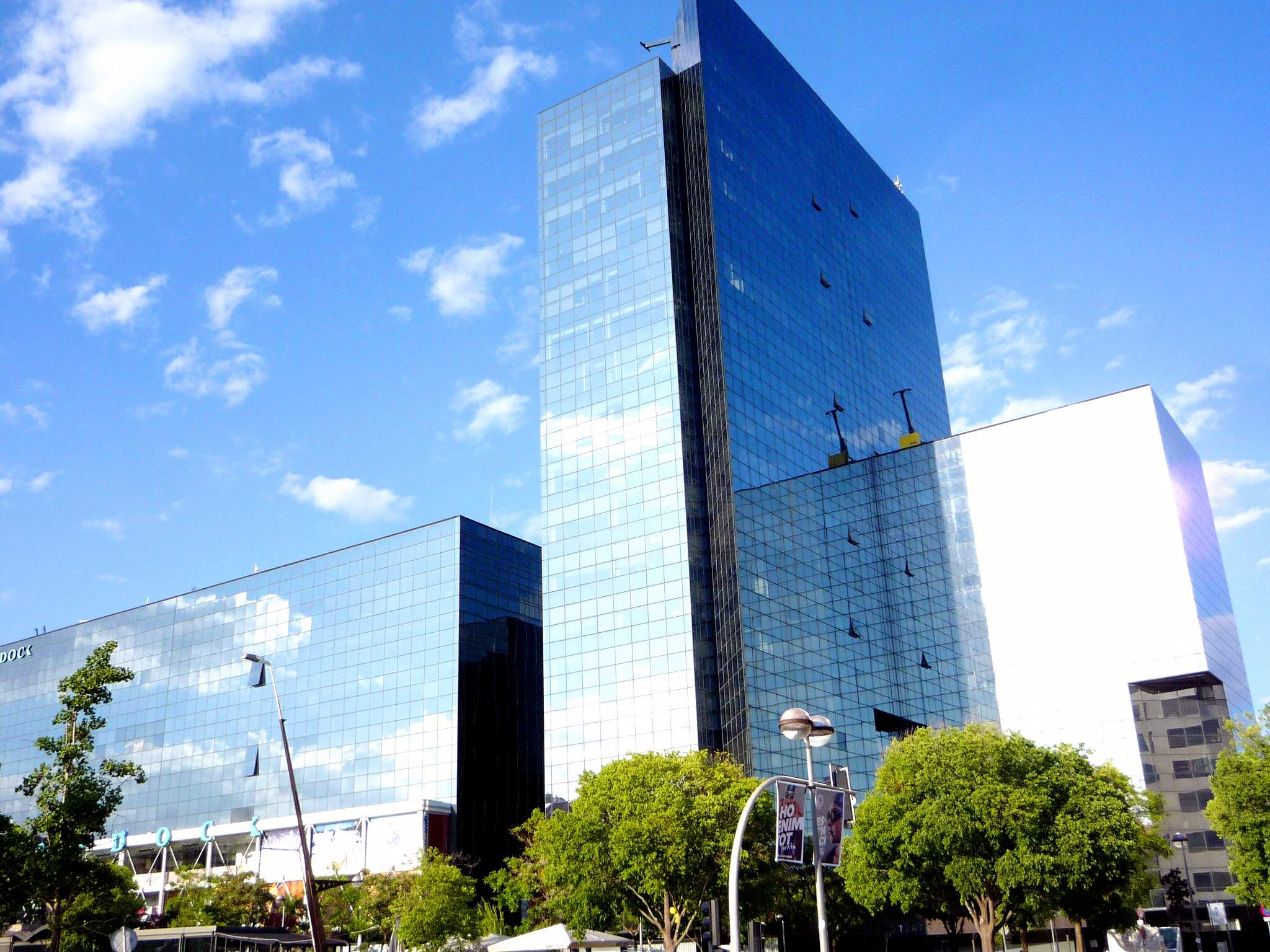
- Interactive map of the Paddock Bulevard area

General information
- Status: Completed
- Type: office
- Location: Sabadell (suburb of Barcelona), Spain
- Completed: 1998

Height
- Height: 82 m (269 ft)

Technical details
- Floor count: 20

Paddock Bulevard - is a skyscraper in Sabadell (suburb of Barcelona), Spain. Completed in 1998, has 20 floors and rises 82 m (269 ft). Lies near other two skyscrapers: Torre Millenium and Les Orenetes de l'Eix.

== See also ==
- List of tallest buildings in Barcelona
