= Torre Millenium =

22 floor skyscraper in Sabadell, Spain

Coordinates: 41.5551°N 2.0980°E

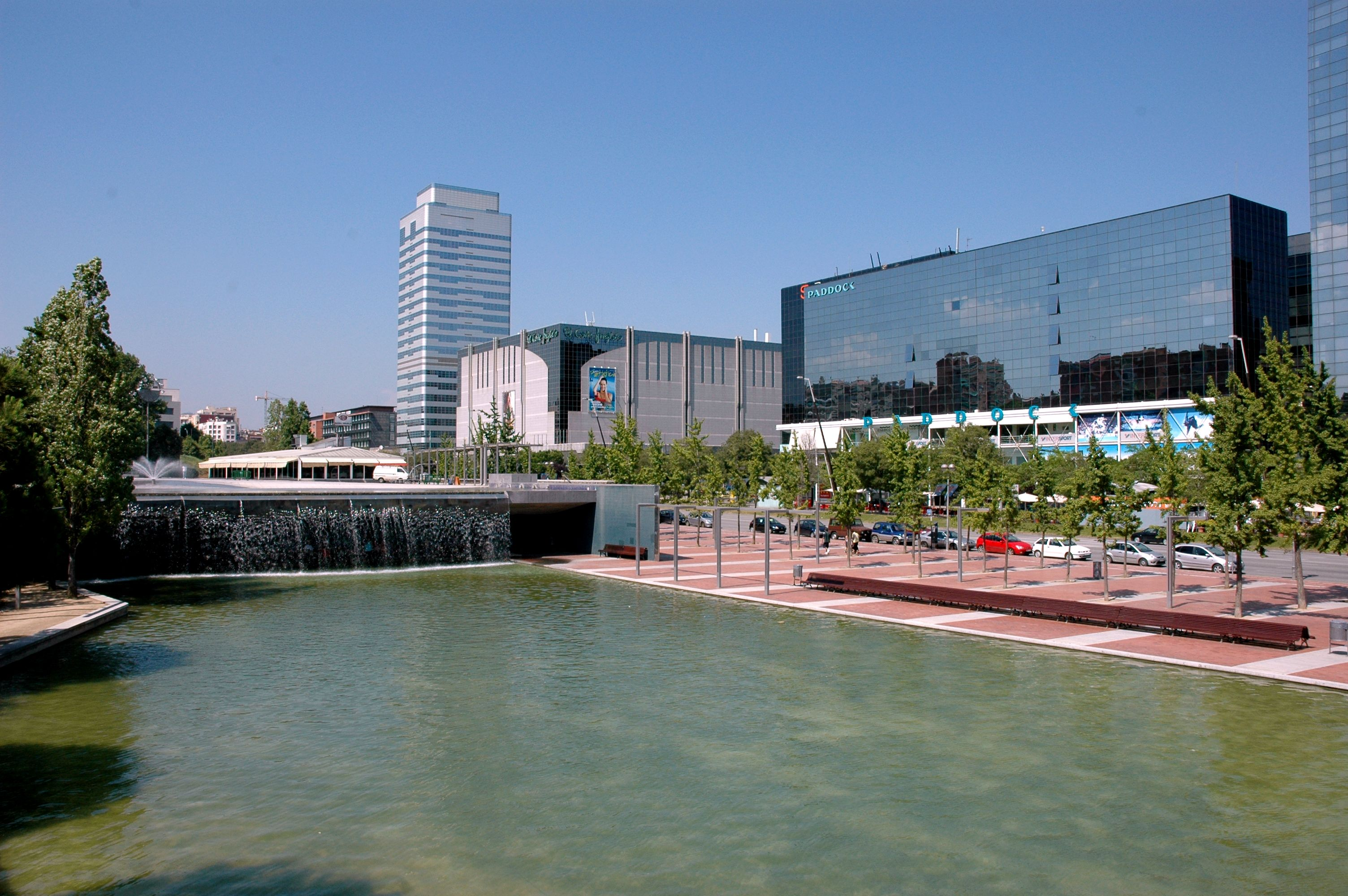
- Interactive map of the Torre Millenium area

General information
- Status: Completed
- Type: office
- Location: Sabadell (city of Catalonia), Spain
- Completed: 2002

Height
- Height: 90 m (295 ft)

Technical details
- Floor count: 22

Torre Millenium is a skyscraper in Sabadell, Catalonia, Spain. The building was completed in 2002, has 22 floors and rises 90 metres. It lies near other two skyscrapers, Paddock Bulevard and Les Orenetes de l'Eix.

== See also ==
- List of tallest buildings and structures in Barcelona
