= Parc de Montjuïc station =

Metro station

Parc de Montjuïc
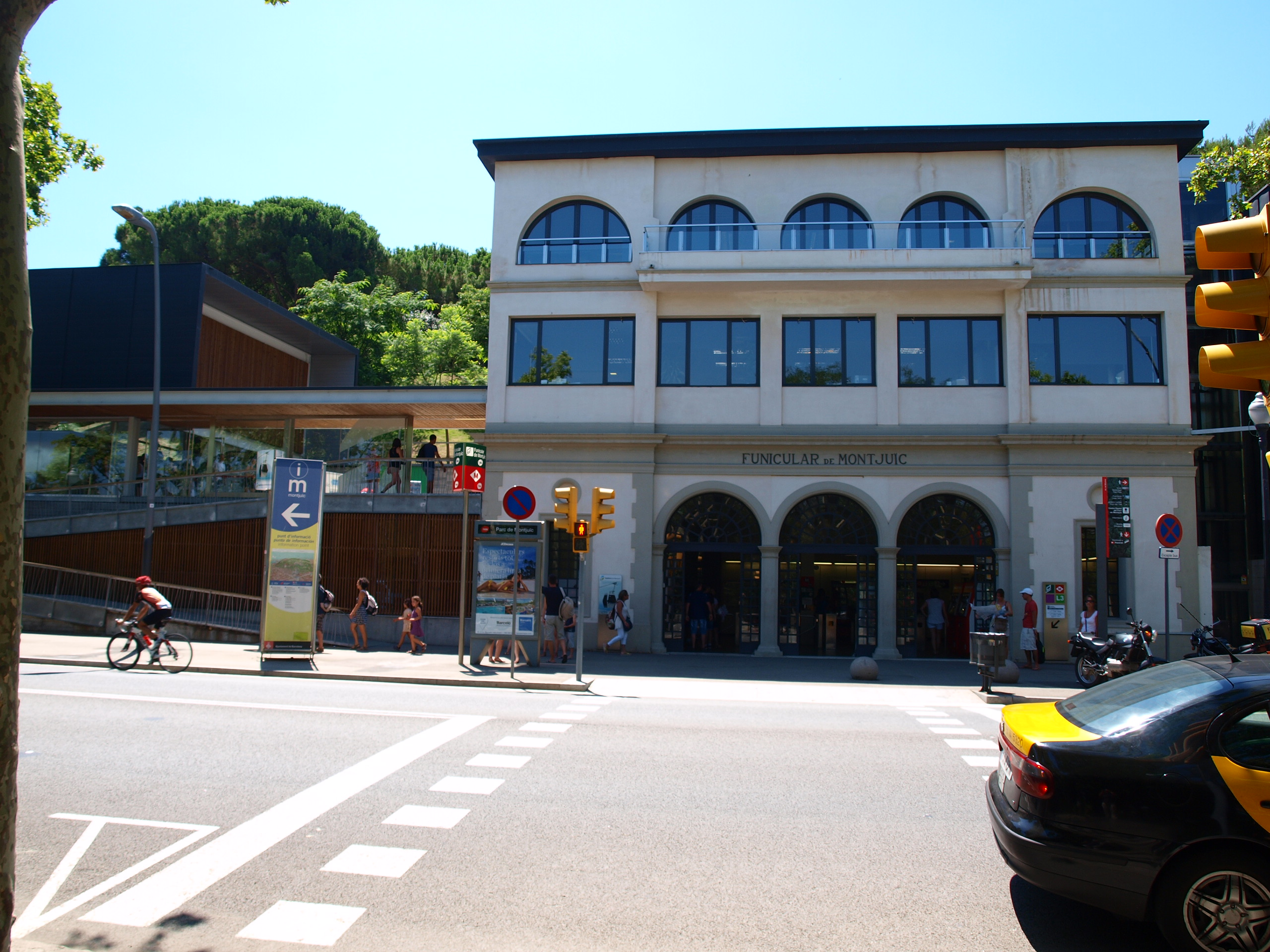
- Exterior of the funicular station, with cable car station to left

General information
- Coordinates: 41.368731°N 2.16318°E
- System: Barcelona Metro funicular station
- Operator: Transports Metropolitans de Barcelona
- Platforms: 2 side platforms
- Connections: Montjuïc Cable Car

Construction
- Accessible: yes

Other information
- Fare zone: 1 (ATM)

History
- Opened: 1928

Services
Preceding station	Metro	Following station
Terminus	Montjuïc Funicular	Paral·lel Terminus
Location
- Location within Barcelona Location within Spain

Parc de Montjuïc is the upper station of the Funicular de Montjuïc, which is operated by Transports Metropolitans de Barcelona (TMB) as part of the Barcelona Metro. The station serves the hill of Montjuïc and the various sporting and other facilities there.

The funicular accepts Autoritat del Transport Metropolità (ATM) tickets, and the station therefore has ticket machines and barriers identical to those of all other Barcelona metro stations. The station has twin platforms, one on each side of the terminal track. Because of the gradient at the upper end of the funicular, the stations platforms are stepped, but disabled access is provided to the upper step of the platform.

The funicular station is adjacent to the lower station of the Montjuïc Cable Car, a gondola lift that continues uphill to a terminal near the Montjuïc Castle on the summit of the hill. Whilst operated by the TMB, the cable car does not accept metro ticketing, and passengers must exit one station before entering the other.

== Gallery ==
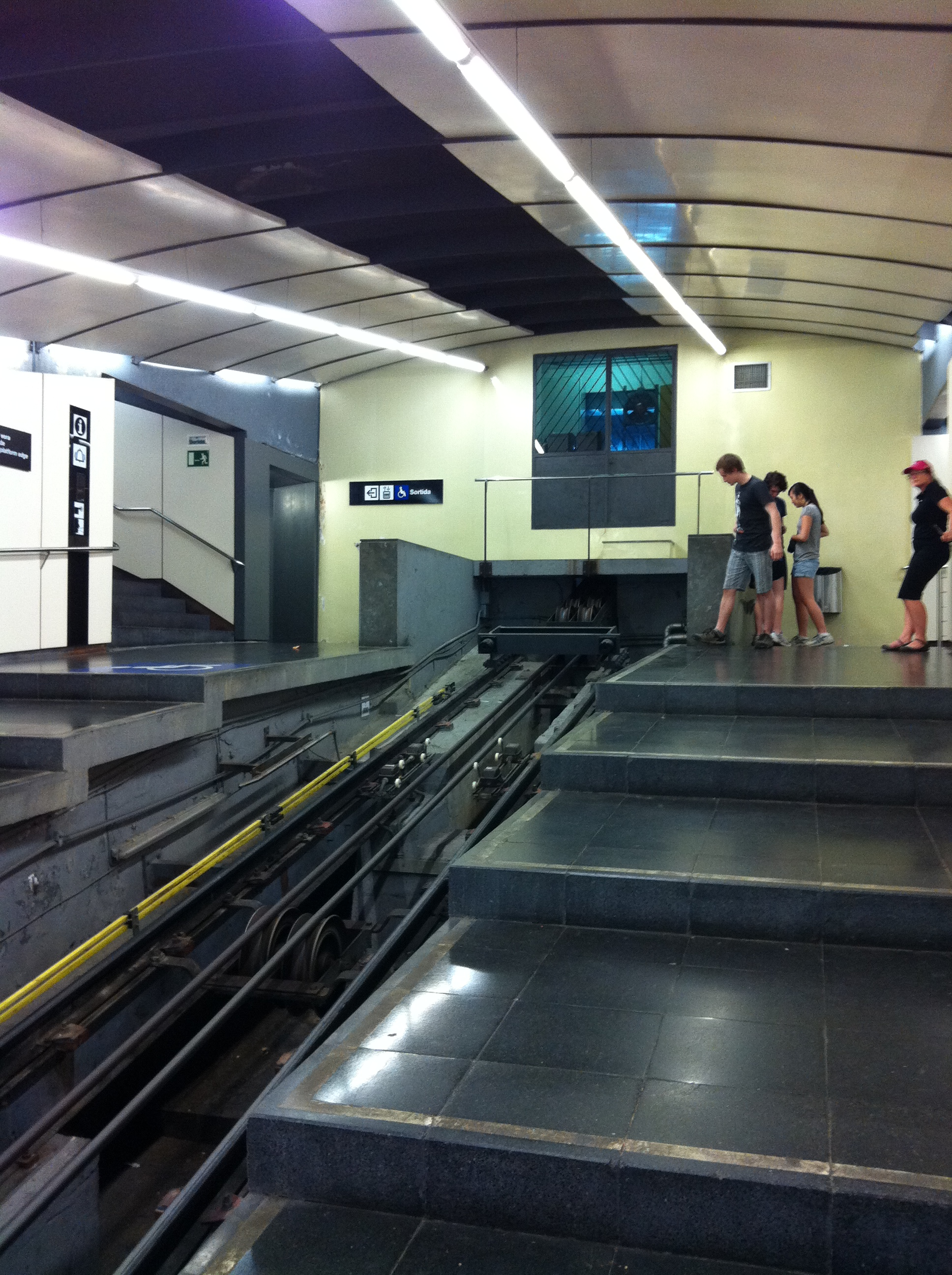
The platforms looking uphill

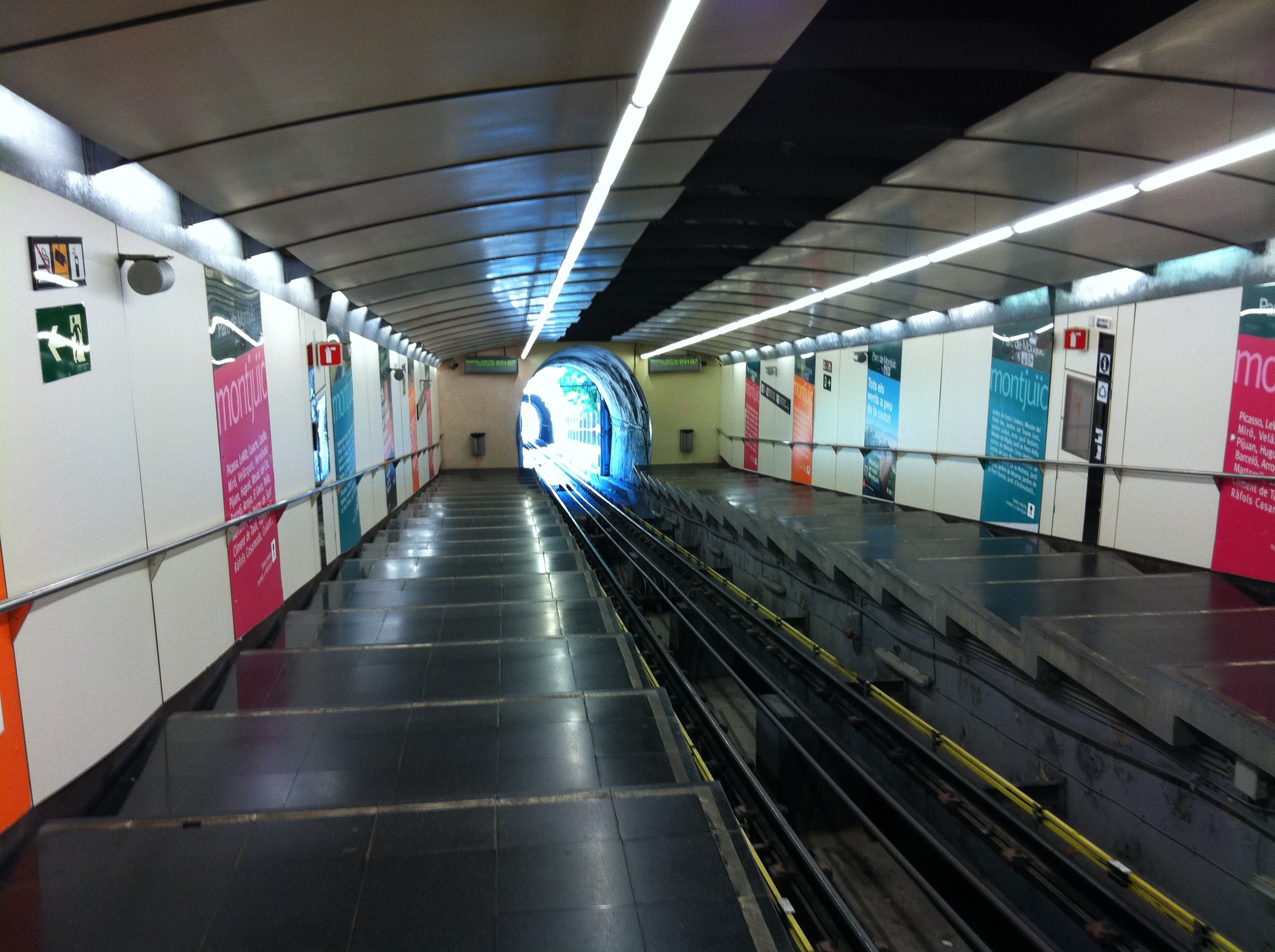
The platforms looking downhill

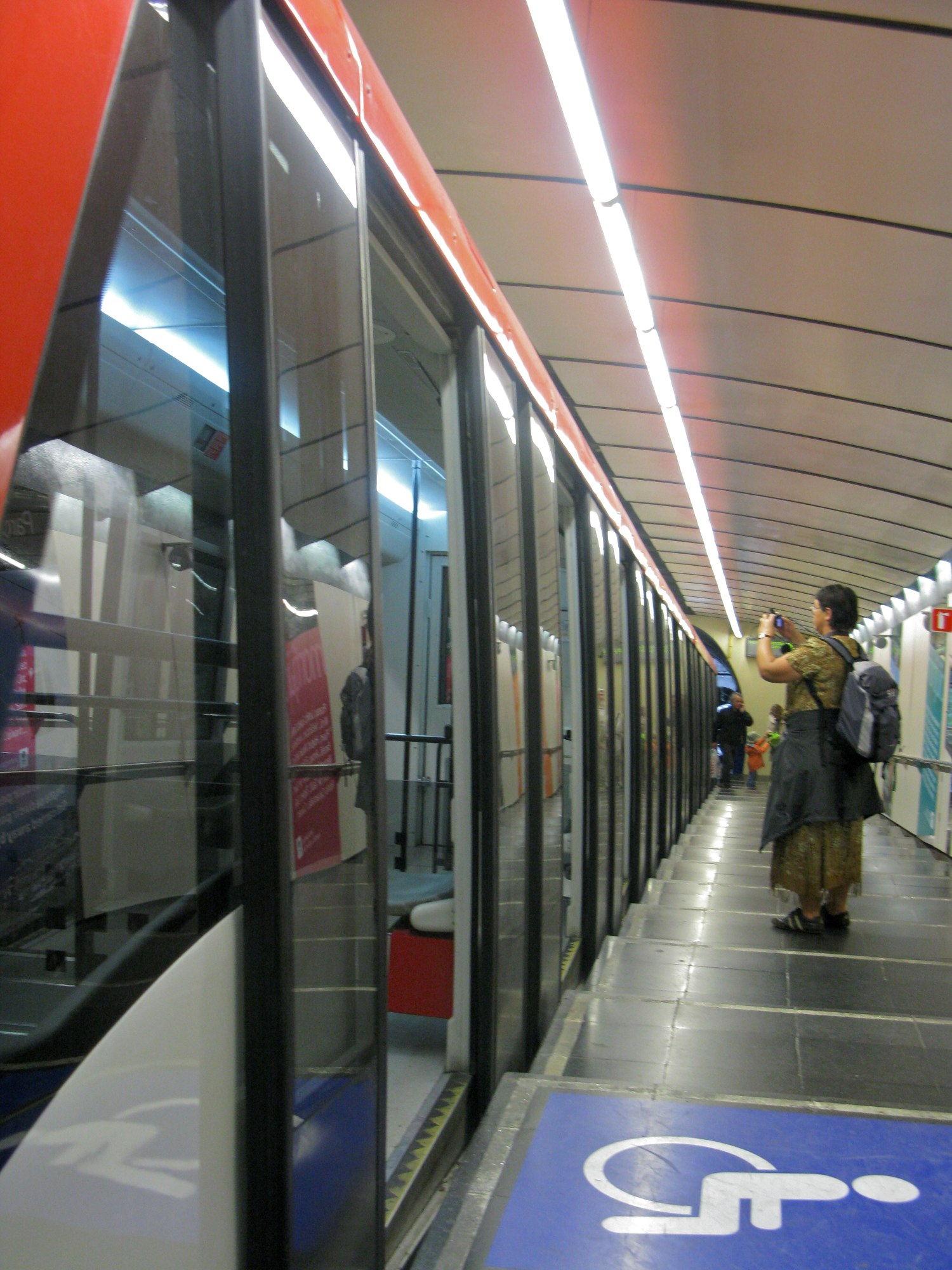
Car in the station
