= Montjuïc Cable Car =

Gondola lift in Barcelona, Spain

Coordinates: 41°22′14″N 2°10′14″E

- Telefèric de Montjuïc
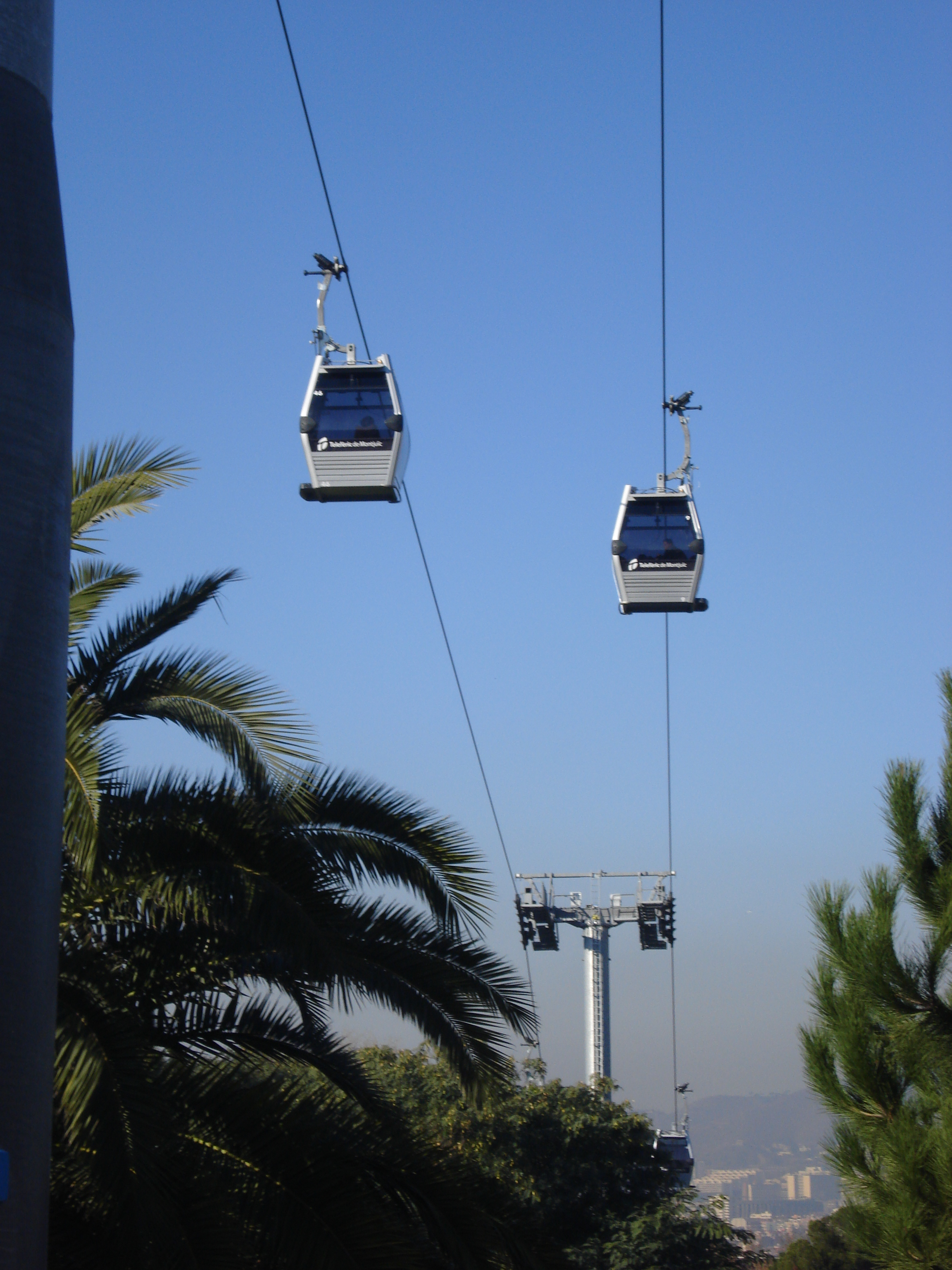
- Interactive map of Montjuïc Cable Car

Overview
- Status: Operational
- Character: Gondola lift
- Location: Barcelona, Catalonia, Spain
- Termini: Montjuïc Park; Montjuïc Castle
- No. of stations: Montjuïc Park; Mirador (downhill only); Montjuïc Castle
- Open: 1970
- Website: www.telefericdemontjuic.cat

Operation
- Operator: Transports Metropolitans de Barcelona
- Carrier capacity: 55 closed cabins, all with wheelchair facilities

Technical features
- Aerial lift type: Mono-cable gondola detachable
- Manufactured by: Leitner Ropeways
- Line length: 752 m (2,467 ft)
- Operating speed: 2.5 m/s (8.2 ft/s)

Logo del Telefèric de Montjuïc

The Montjuïc Cable Car (officially Telefèric de Montjuïc, in Catalan) is a gondola lift in Barcelona, Catalonia, Spain. The cable car runs from a lower terminus adjacent to the Montjuïc Park upper station of the Montjuïc funicular, and climbs higher up the Montjuïc hill to a terminal near the Montjuïc Castle on the summit of the hill. At its midpoint, the line executes a 90 degree turn and the cabins pass through Mirador station, although only down-bound cabins stop at this point.

The cable car was originally put into service in 1970, replacing a former upper stage of the Montjuïc funicular. As built, it used a fleet of open cars. It was closed between October 2004 and May 2007, for a complete overhaul in order to increase capacity. At the same time the open cars were replaced by 55 new closed cabins.

The cable car line is 752 m (2,467 ft) in length, and climbs a vertical distance of 84.55 m (277.4 ft) at a speed of 2.5 m/s (8.2 ft/s). The cars slow to a crawl as they pass through the station to allow passengers to board or exit. Two cars are equipped with the facility to carry wheelchairs. The line is operated by Transports Metropolitans de Barcelona (TMB) but, unlike the Montjuïc funicular, it is not part of Autoritat del Transport Metropolità (ATM) integrated fare network. Separate tickets must be purchased prior to boarding. Access to the castle is also available from the top funicular station via the 150 bus which is included in the ATM integrated fare network.

The Montjuïc Cable Car should not be confused with the Port Vell Aerial Tramway, which crosses Port Vell, Barcelona's old harbour, and connects the Montjuïc hill with the seaside suburb of Barceloneta.

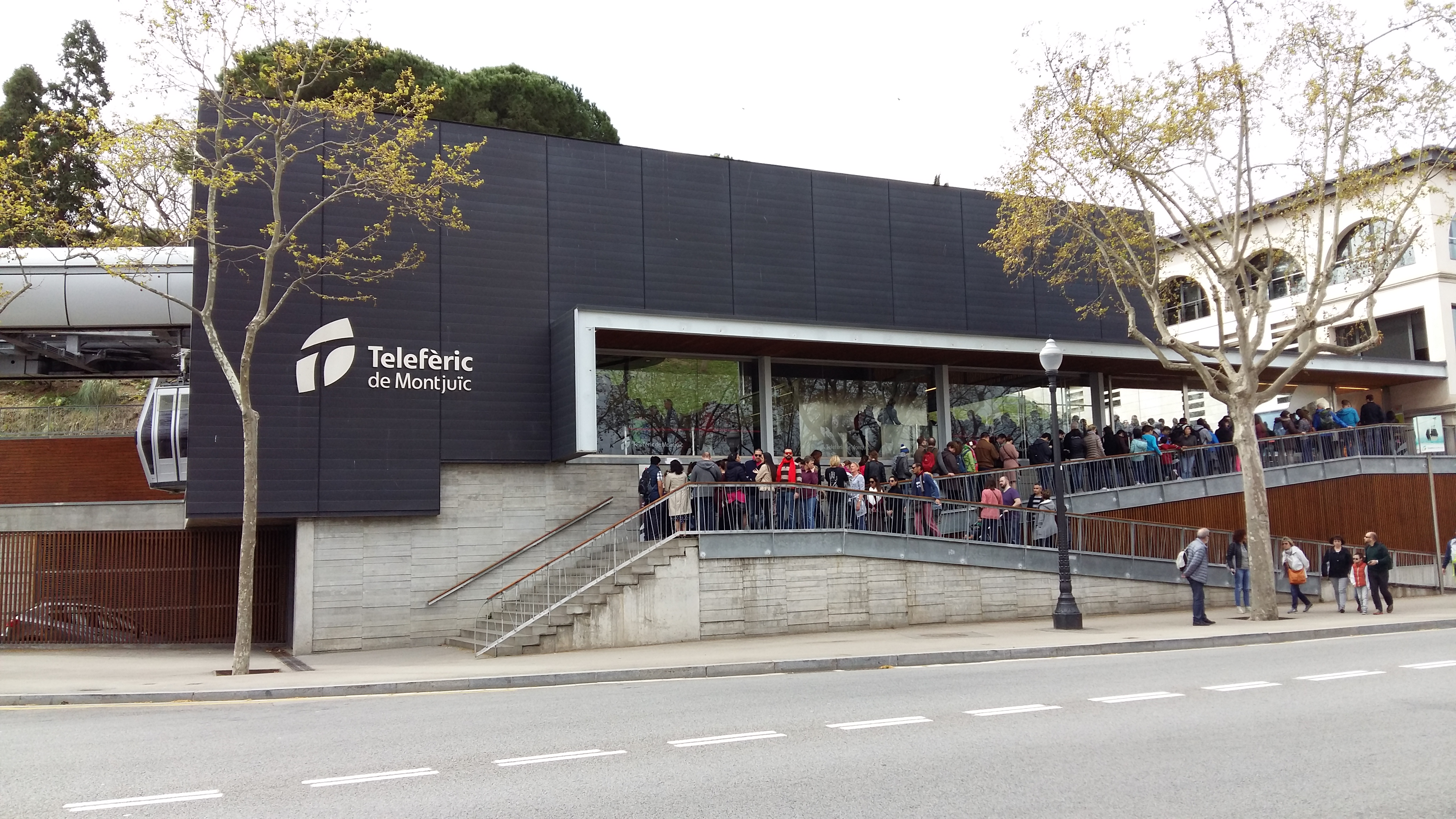
The lower station of the cable car

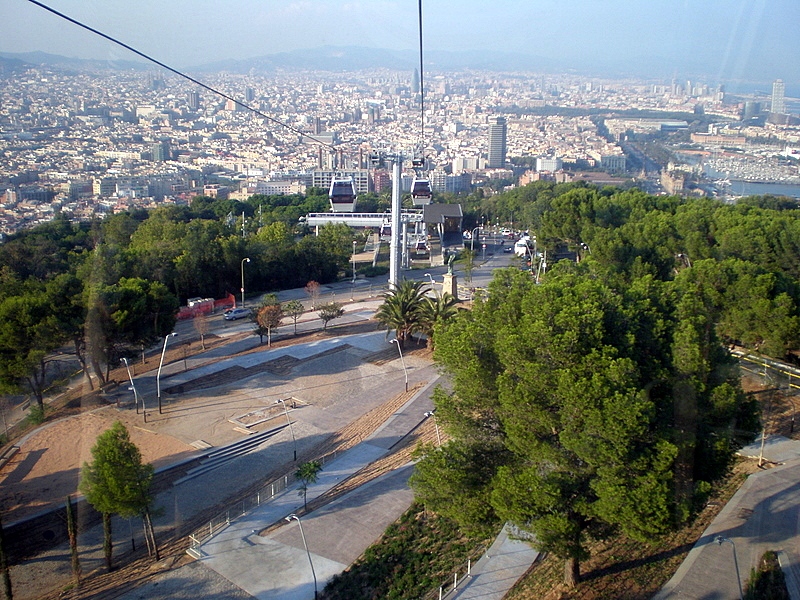
The cable car above the Gardens of Joan Brossa

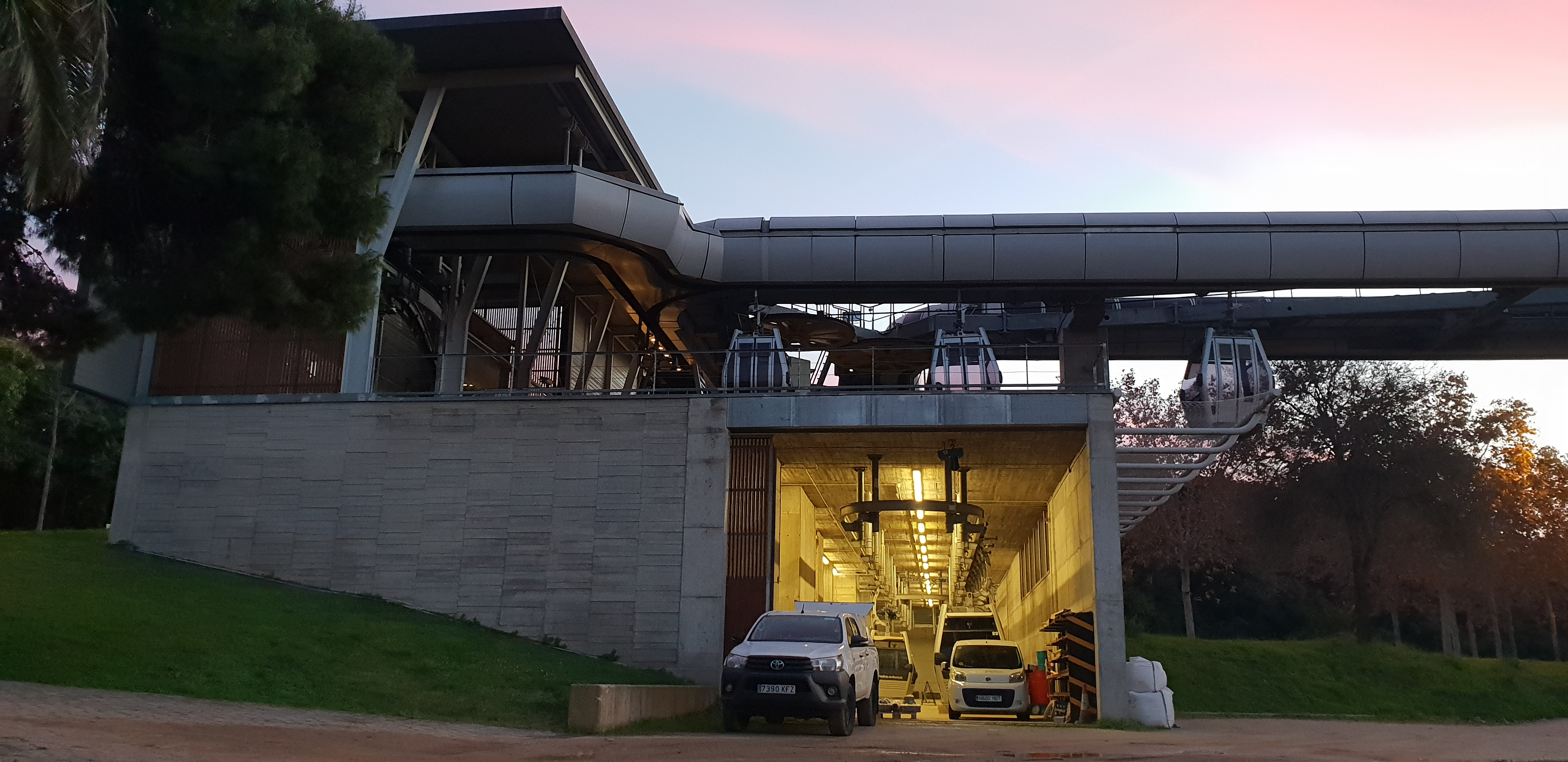
Intermediate station showing basement cable car store

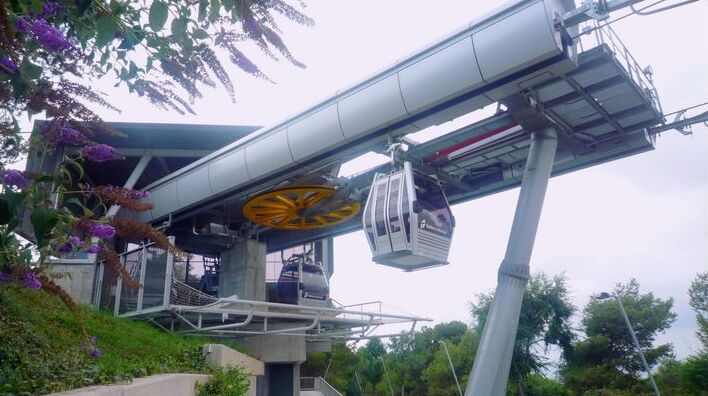
The upper station of the cable car
