= Torre Sant Sebastià =

Coordinates: 41.37311°N 2.18780°E

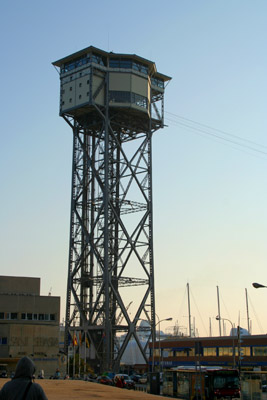
Torre de St.Sebastià.

Torre Sant Sebastià is a 78-metre-tall (256 ft) free-standing lattice tower in Barcelona, Catalonia, Spain which is used as a suspension cable station. It is the terminal of the Port Vell Aerial Tramway of Barcelona, which runs over Torre Jaume I to Montjuïc. Torre Sant Sebastia was opened in 1931. It has two elevators to get up to the top of the tower and a restaurant on the top.

== See also ==
- List of towers
