= Port Vell Aerial Tramway =

Aerial tramway

Coordinates: 41°22′20″N 2°10′48.5″E

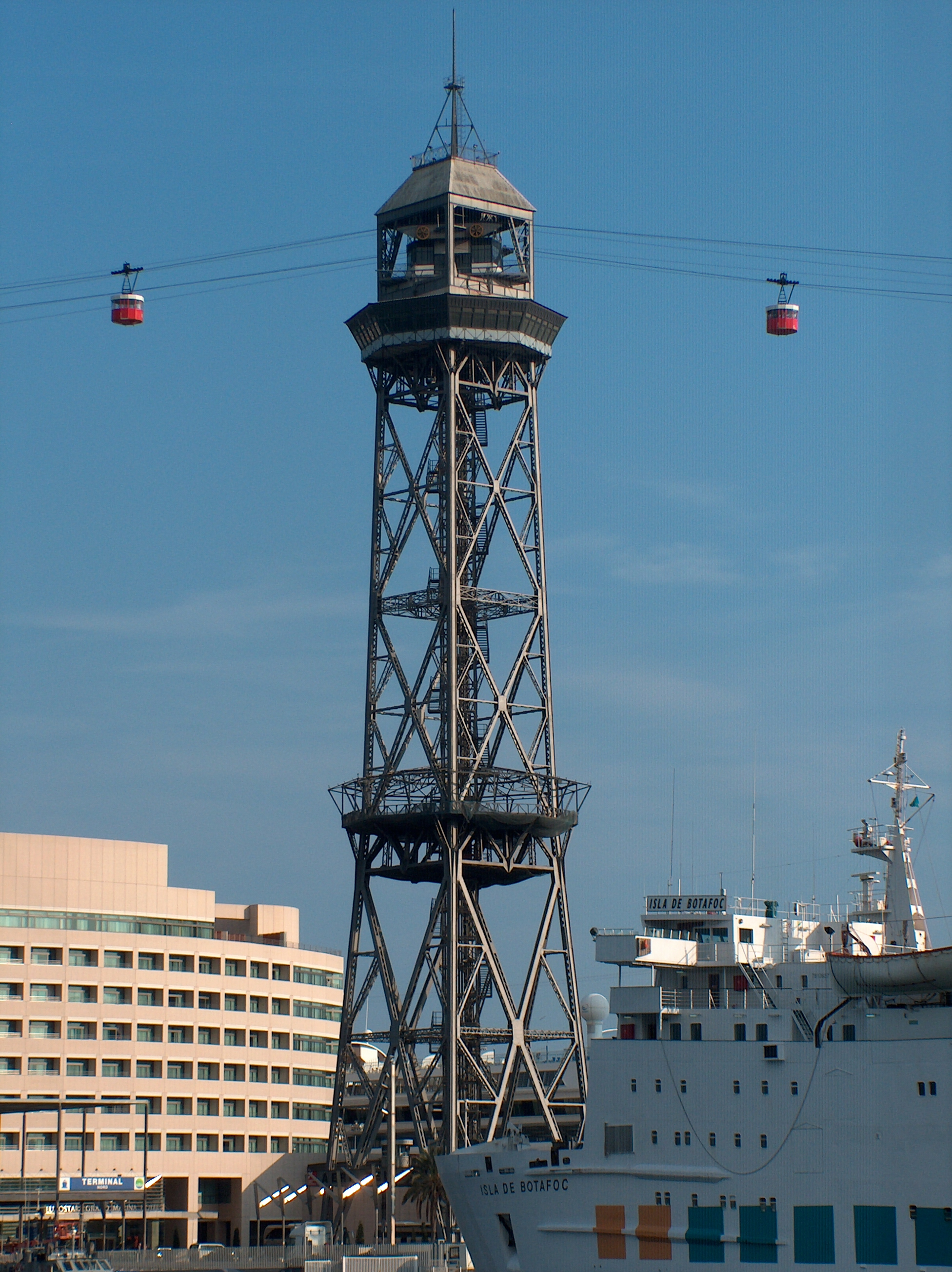
- Port Vell Aerial Tramway; cabins leaving Torre Jaume I
- Interactive map of Port Vell Aerial Tramway

Overview
- Status: Operational
- Character: Aerial tramway
- Location: Barcelona, Catalonia, Spain (EU)
- Termini: Torre Sant Sebastià; Estación de Miramar in Montjuïc
- No. of stations: Torre Sant Sebastià; Torre Jaume I Estación de Miramar in Montjuïc
- Open: 1931

Operation
- Operator: Teleféricos de Barcelona

Technical features
- Aerial lift type: Aerial tramway
- Line length: 1.3 km (0.81 mi)
- Operating speed: 3 m/s
- Notes: elevation 107 m (351 ft) the average height: 46 m (151 ft)

The Port Vell Aerial Tramway (Catalan: Telefèric del Port or Aeri del Port, Spanish: Teleférico del Puerto) is an aerial tramway in Barcelona, Catalonia, Spain. It crosses Port Vell, Barcelona's old harbour, connecting the Montjuïc hill with the seaside suburb of Barceloneta.

The aerial tramway first opened in 1931 and is principally a tourist attraction, used on account of its excellent views of the city and its port. It is operated by Teleféricos de Barcelona S.A. and is not part of Autoritat del Transport Metropolità (ATM) integrated fare network. Separate tickets must be purchased prior to boarding.

The aerial tramway should not be confused with the Montjuïc Cable Car, a gondola lift that links the upper terminus of the Montjuïc funicular with Montjuïc Castle.

== Route ==
The tramway starts at Miramar station halfway down the hill of Montjuïc at an altitude of 57 m (187 ft), passes through the peak of Torre Jaume I which is 107 m (351 ft) high and ends at the top of Torre Sant Sebastià at 86 m (282 ft), from where an elevator descends to the streets of Barceloneta.

The ride offers a fine view over Barcelona, the nearby Plaça del Portal de la Pau with the Columbus Monument, Port Vell with its Balearic ferries and the World Trade Centre, and Barceloneta with its Mediterranean beaches. The tower Torre Jaume I was the world's highest aerial lift pylon until 1966, when the Glacial Aerial Tramway Kaprun III opened.

== History ==
The tramway was intended to be an attraction at the 1929 Barcelona International Exposition, a World's fair. The Air Rail San Sebastian-Miramar, S.A. was incorporated and obtained the royal licence to build and operate the tramway. The manager of the project was Juan Rodriguez Roda. The towers were designed by the architect Carles Buïgas and built by Material para Ferrocarriles y Construcciones S.A.. The tramway was built by Bleichert, at that time a company with a worldwide reputation, which had just completed the Aeri de Montserrat. However, the size of the project was underestimated and the tramway did not open until 12 September 1931.

Initially, the tramway consisted of two sections with two cars each. The cabins travelled from the terminal stations to Torre Jaume I and back, with one haul rope for the total length to move all four cabins.

All hopes for a commercial success of the venture were annihilated in the Great Depression and in the Spanish Civil War (1936–1939). Torre Jaume I was used as a look-out and a machine gun post. The tramway was heavily damaged and reduced to the rusting towers. One of the two surviving cabins was transferred to Aeri de Montserrat, which started to operate again in 1940. There were discussions to demolish the installation completely. Eventually, Friedrich Gründel, Bleichert's chief engineer during construction, succeeded in establishing Teleféricos de Barcelona, S.A.. In 1960, Torre Sebastià reopened with a new restaurant at its top, followed two years later by Torre Jaume I. In 1963 the tramway reopened with only two cabins, which travelled along the total length and through the top of Torre Jaume I. After Gründel's death ownership changed several times, commercial returns diminished and the technical status deteriorated. The authorities had decided to close it, when, in 1996, Barcelona decided to redevelop Port Vell and to build the World Trade Centre. The tramway was also renovated and it reopened in 2000.

== Technical details ==
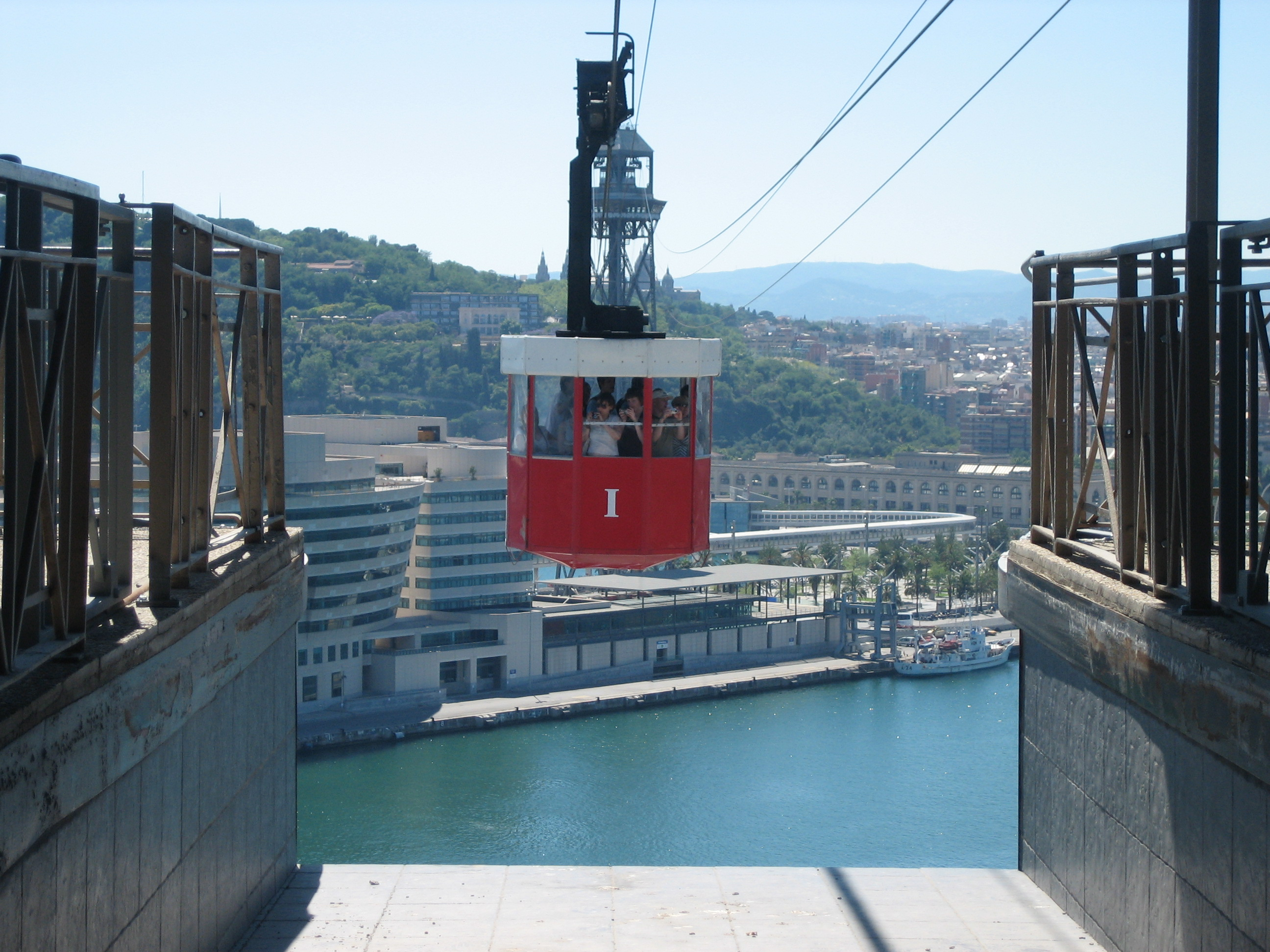
Port Vell Aerial Tramway, shuttle from Torre Sant Sebastià

The line is 1,303 m (4,275 ft) long, with sections of 652 m (2,139 ft) and 651 m (2,136 ft). The original cabins, which are still in use, take 20 passengers each plus the cabin attendant, and have an empty weight of 1,350 kg (2,980 lb).

The tramway was built by Bleichert on the Bleichert-Zuegg system with track ropes of 45 mm (1.8 in) and a haul rope of 23 mm (0.91 in). There was also an auxiliary rope of 17 mm (0.67 in) for a small open service vehicle, which could be used to evacuate the cabins. The cable speed is 3 m/s (9.8 ft/s), driven by an electric motor in Miramar station, with tension weights in the Torre Sant Sebastià. The Port Vell Aerial Tramway is almost identical to the Predigtstuhl Cable Car in Bad Reichenhall, Germany, that Bleichert had built in 1928.

== Tower names ==
Jaume I is the Catalan name of James I of Aragon (1208–1276), King of Aragon and Count of Barcelona. Sant Sebastià is the Catalan name of San Sebastián, the Spanish town where in 1907, Leonardo Torres Quevedo had opened his pioneer public aerial ropeway on Monte Ulia.
