= Maians (island) =

Islet off the coast of Barcelona

Map showing the location of Maians Island, in the area where the Barcelona França railway station is now located.

Maians was a sandy islet formed by ocean currents, located about a hundred meters from the coastline of Barcelona. It was absorbed by the city when the first Port of Barcelona was created. The work began on 20 September 1477, during the reign of King John II of Aragon.

== History ==
When Maians was absorbed, it marked the geographical beginnings of the current neighborhood of La Barceloneta. The eastern levee, built over the old island, retained the sands carried over by the ocean currents and the materials deposited by the Besòs river. Therefore, La Barceloneta owes its existence to the land thus reclaimed from the sea.

In 1985, author Quim Monzó published a book of stories (in Catalan) with the title borrowed from the name of this now-defunct island: L'illa de Maians (ISBN 978-84-7727-300-4).

== See also ==
- Urban planning of Barcelona
- History of Barcelona
- Port of Barcelona
- Port Vell
- La Barceloneta, Barcelona
