= Montjuïc Communications Tower =

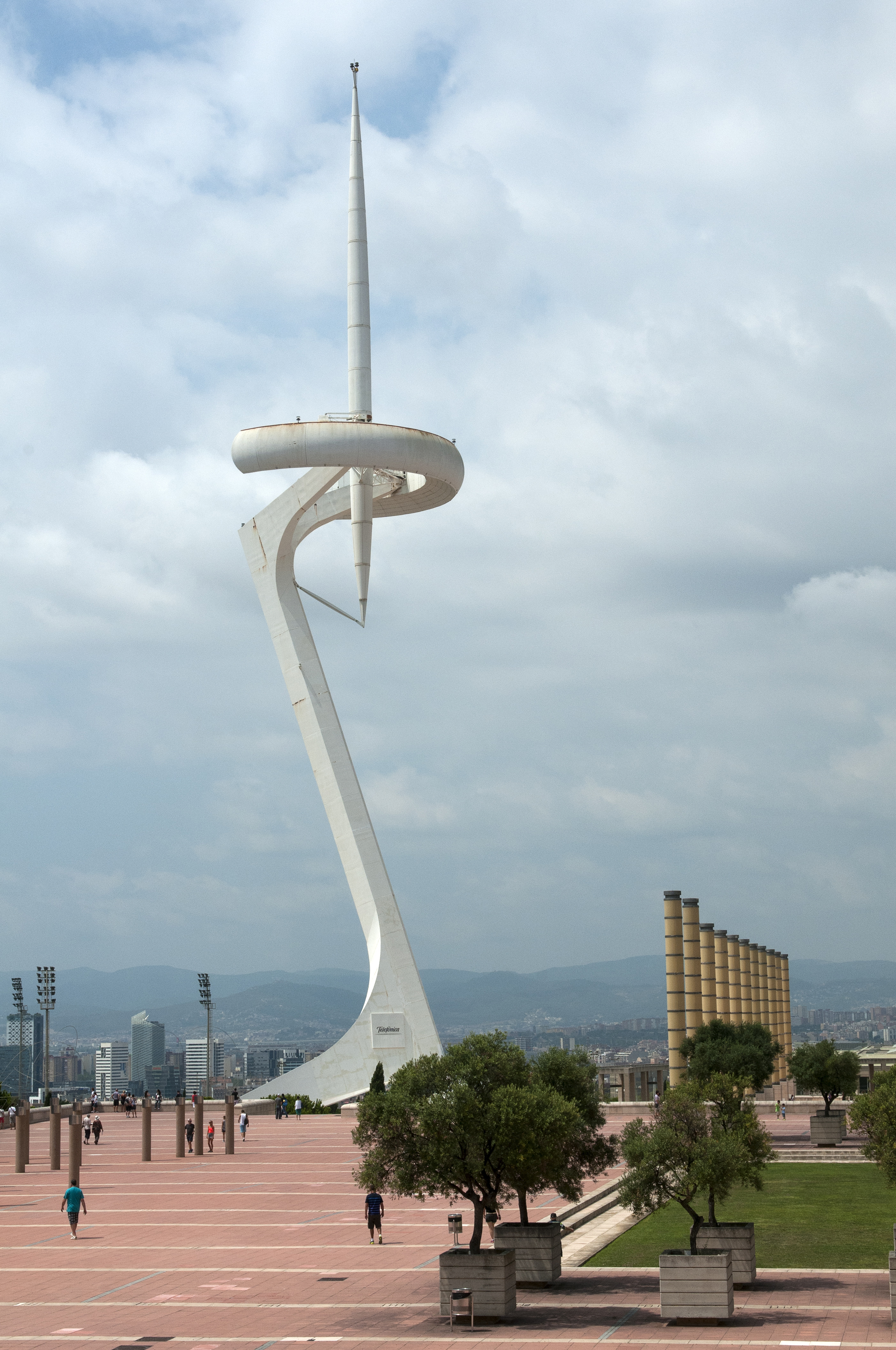
- Interactive map of the Montjuïc Communications Tower area

General information
- Status: Completed
- Type: Telecommunications
- Architectural style: Neo-futurism
- Location: Montjuïc; Barcelona, Catalonia, Spain
- Coordinates: 41°21′51″N 2°09′02″E
- Construction started: 1989
- Completed: 1992

Height
- Antenna spire: 136 m (446 ft)

Design and construction
- Architect: Santiago Calatrava

The Montjuïc Communications Tower (Catalan: Torre de Comunicacions de Montjuïc, IPA: [ˈtorə ðə kumunikəsiˈonz ðə muɲʒuˈik]), popularly known as Torre Calatrava and Torre Telefónica, is a telecommunication tower in the Montjuïc neighbourhood of Barcelona, Catalonia, Spain. It was designed by Santiago Calatrava, with construction taking place from 1989 to 1992. The white tower was built for Telefónica to transmit television coverage of the 1992 Summer Olympic Games in Barcelona. The 136-metre (446 ft) tower is located in the Olympic park and represents an athlete holding the Olympic Flame.

The base is covered with trencadís, Gaudí's mosaic technique created from broken tile shards.

== Sundial ==
Because of the tower's orientation, it works also as a giant sundial, which uses the Europa Square to indicate the hour.

== See also ==
- Torre de Collserola
- List of tallest towers
