= Torre de Collserola =

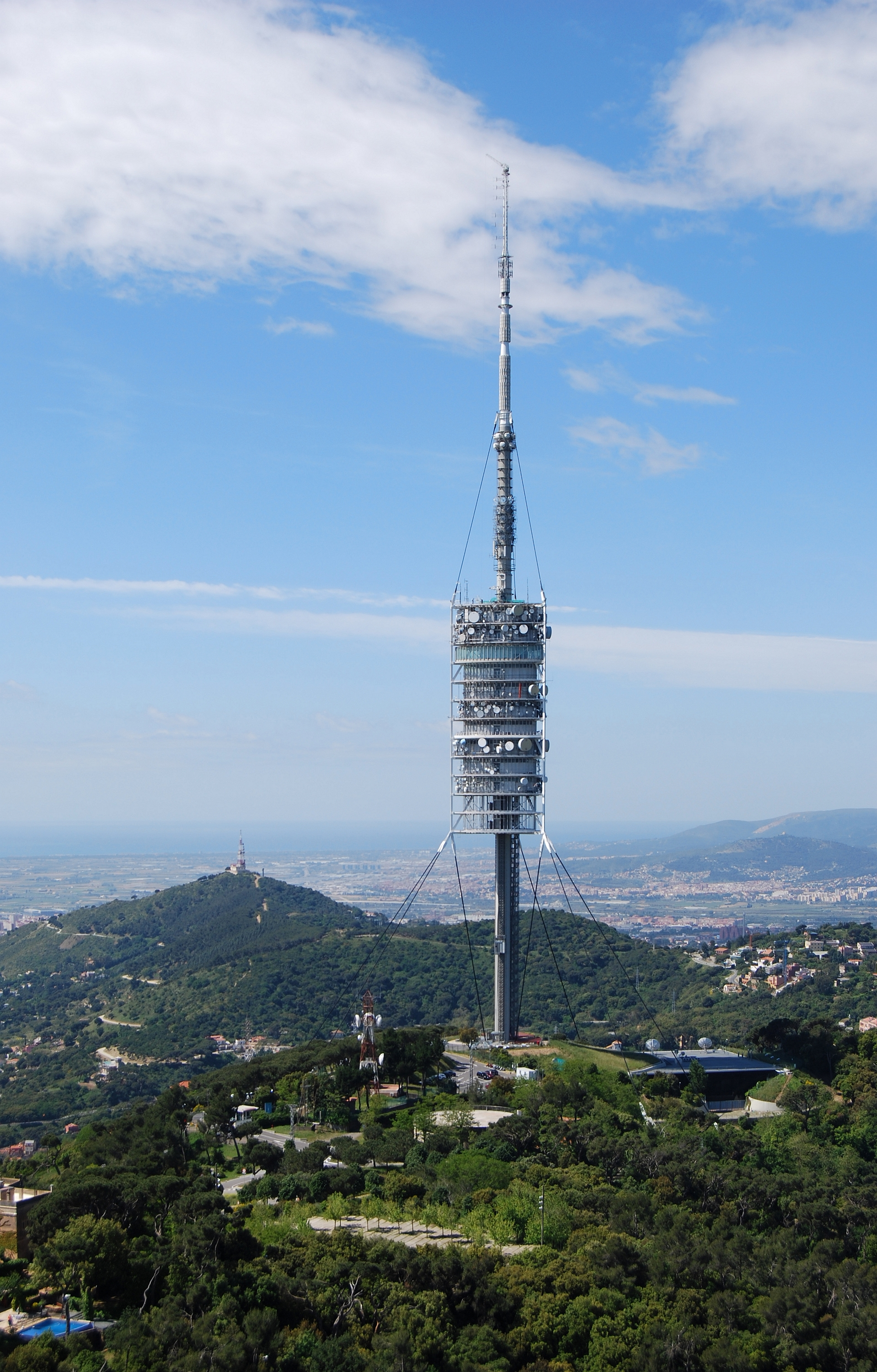
- Interactive map of Torre de Collserola

General information
- Type: Television tower, observation tower
- Location: Barcelona, Catalonia, Spain
- Coordinates: 41°25′02″N 2°06′51″E
- Completed: 1991
- Height: 288.4 m (946.19 ft)

Design and construction
- Architect: Norman Foster
- Civil engineer: Julio Martínez Calzón and Manuel Julià Vilardell
- Main contractor: Cubiertas y MZOV, S.A.

Torre de Collserola (Catalan pronunciation: [ˈtorə ðə ˌkɔʎsəˈɾɔlə]) is a uniquely designed tower located on the Tibidabo hill in the Serra de Collserola, in Barcelona, Catalonia, Spain. It was designed by the architect Sir Norman Foster and by the Spanish civil engineers Julio Martínez Calzón and Manuel Julià Vilardell. This emblematic tower was built in 1991 by the construction company Cubiertas y MZOV S.A. for the 1992 Summer Olympics. It features a pod for floor space like many towers but uses guy wires for lateral support like a mast. Mainly used as a TV and radio transmitter, this futuristic design provides the highest viewpoint over the city. The top antenna reaches 288.4 m (946 ft) and the top of the pod, which has thirteen floors, reaches 152 m (499 ft). The highest point of this tower is the highest place one could be in the city of Barcelona. The tenth floor of the pod is open to the public.

== Events ==
The tower has a space for event organisations, consisting of a reception room and an observation deck set 560 metres above sea level.

== Construction ==
The tower has a hollow slip-formed, reinforced concrete main shaft of only 4.5 m diameter, which reduces to a mere 3 m to hold a radio mast which telescopes from 2.7 m to 0.7 m. The thirteen floors are surrounded by a perimeter of open stainless steel grilles and suspended from the shaft by three primary vertical steel trusses.

The total weight of the tower is 3,000 tons.

A large number of cables keep the tower upright:

- The lower guys are composed three series of 180 parallel strand cables (15 mm diameter) made from pre-tensioned high-strength steel with a polyethylene covering, each;
- The upper guys are made of three series of 7 aramid fibre cables in parallel (56 mm diameter), each terminated with a resin socket. The three upper cables have a combined breaking strength of 4,200 tons.

== See also ==
- Montjuïc Communications Tower
- List of tallest towers
