= Montjuïc Castle =

Military fortress in Barcelona, Spain

Coordinates: 41°21′48″N 2°09′58″E

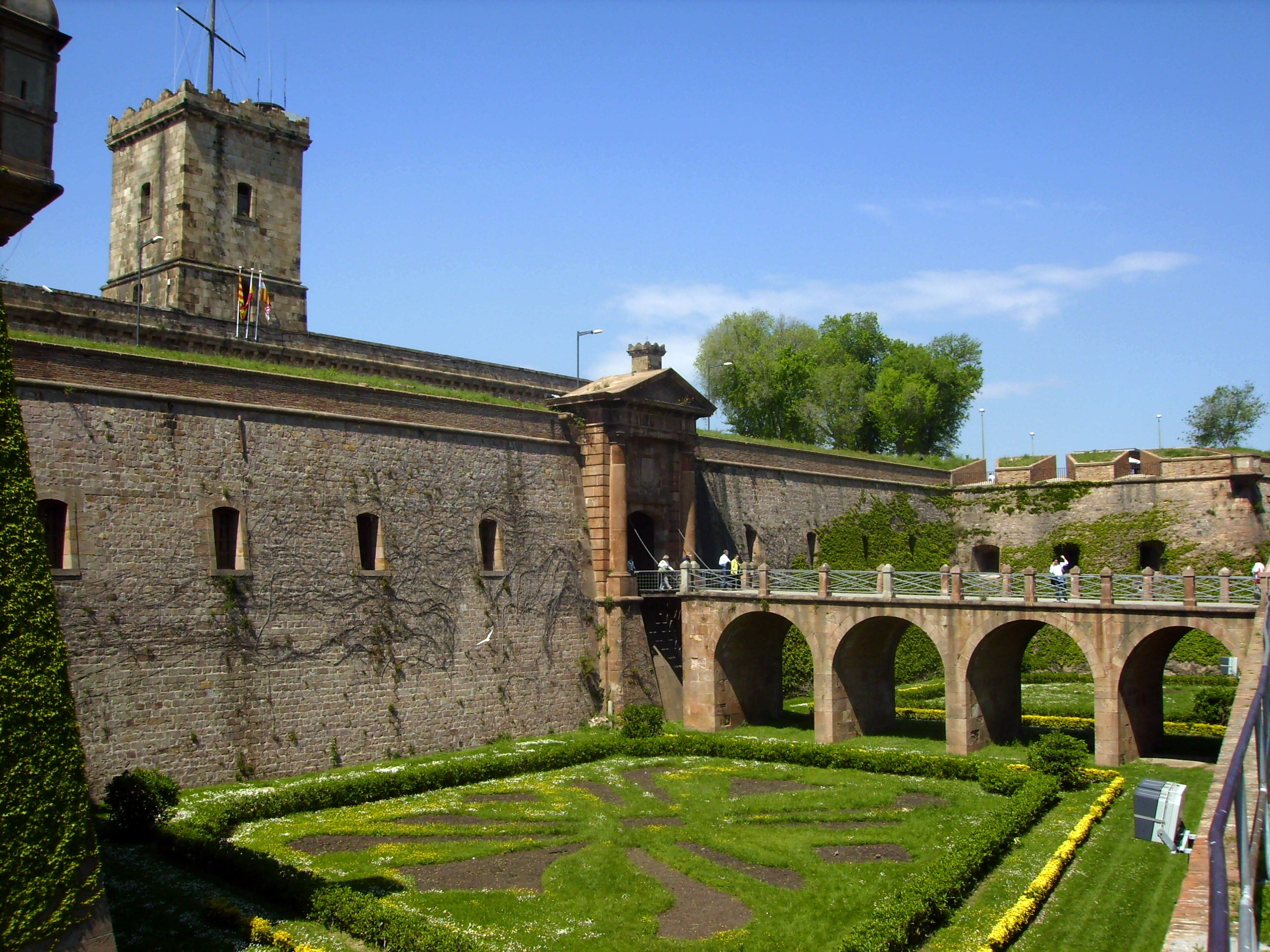
Entrance to Montjuïc Castle across the former moat, now dry and planted as a parterre

Montjuïc Castle (Catalan: Castell de Montjuïc, Spanish: Castillo de Montjuich) is an old military fortress, with roots dating back from 1640, built on top of Montjuïc hill in Barcelona, Catalonia, Spain. It currently serves as a Barcelona municipal facility.

== History ==
The foundation stone for the basic fortification was laid out in 1640. A year later, in January 1641, the fort saw its first battle, during the Catalan Revolt when the Principality of Catalonia challenged Spain's authority. On orders from the King of Spain, Pedro Fajardo, heading an army of 26,000 men, proceeded to crush the revolt. The Spanish recaptured several cities, but they were defeated at the Battle of Montjuïc by Catalan, led by Francesc de Tamarit. At that battle, Colonel Shane O'Neill or known in Spain as Prince Juan O'Neill, died leading his regiment during the Battle of Montjuic near Barcelona, dying from a musket-ball wound to his chest near the town of Castelldefels. In his honor, the King of Spain granted the Colonel the death title of Viscount Montjuïc.

Fifty years later, in 1694, new bastions and battlements were erected and the fortress became a castle. In the Siege of Barcelona (1705) the fortress was captured by the British 6th Regiment of Foot led by Lt.-Col William Southwell, paving the way for the siege of Barcelona itself. Southwell was afterwards made Governor of the castle.

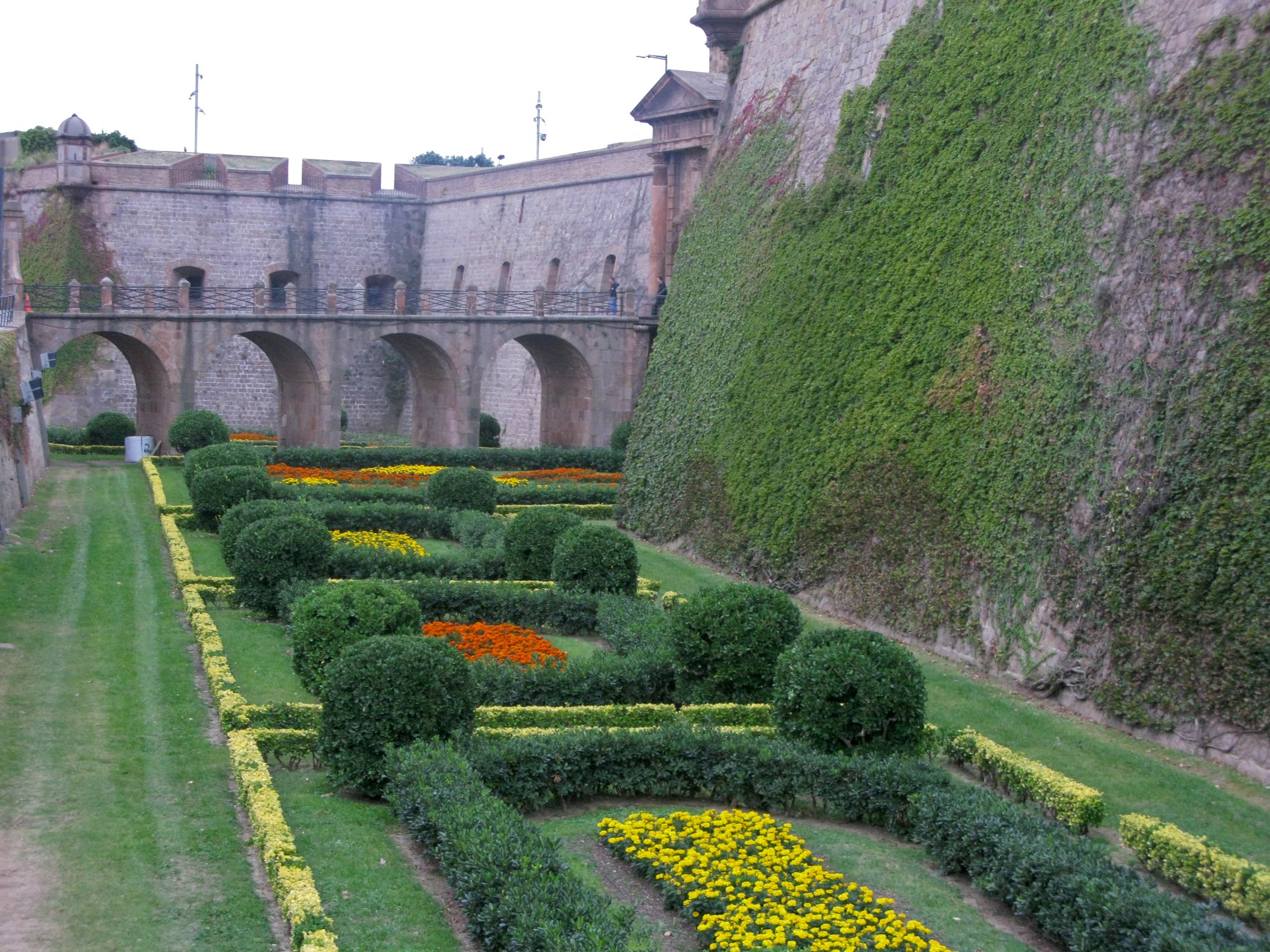
The fortifications are now extensively planted with parterre gardens.

As an extraordinary engineer and with the rank of second lieutenant, Giovanni Antonio Medrano was assigned to the garrisons of Catalonia, Valencia and Murcia, specializing in the design of large territorial infrastructures and plants for the military defence, such as Montjuïc Castle in Barcelona which he drew up in 1730. With these new designs, the old fort was demolished in 1751 by the Spanish engineer and architect Juan Martin Cermeño, creating the current structure, still standing. The final shape of the castle took form during 1779 and 1799, when major construction works took place in order to improve the castle and accommodate the needs. It was also during this time that the castle was equipped with 120 cannons.

During the Napoleonic Wars, the French Army entered Barcelona, and, on orders from Napoleon, they also captured the castle without firing a shot as the troops guarding the castle were ordered not to fight the French.

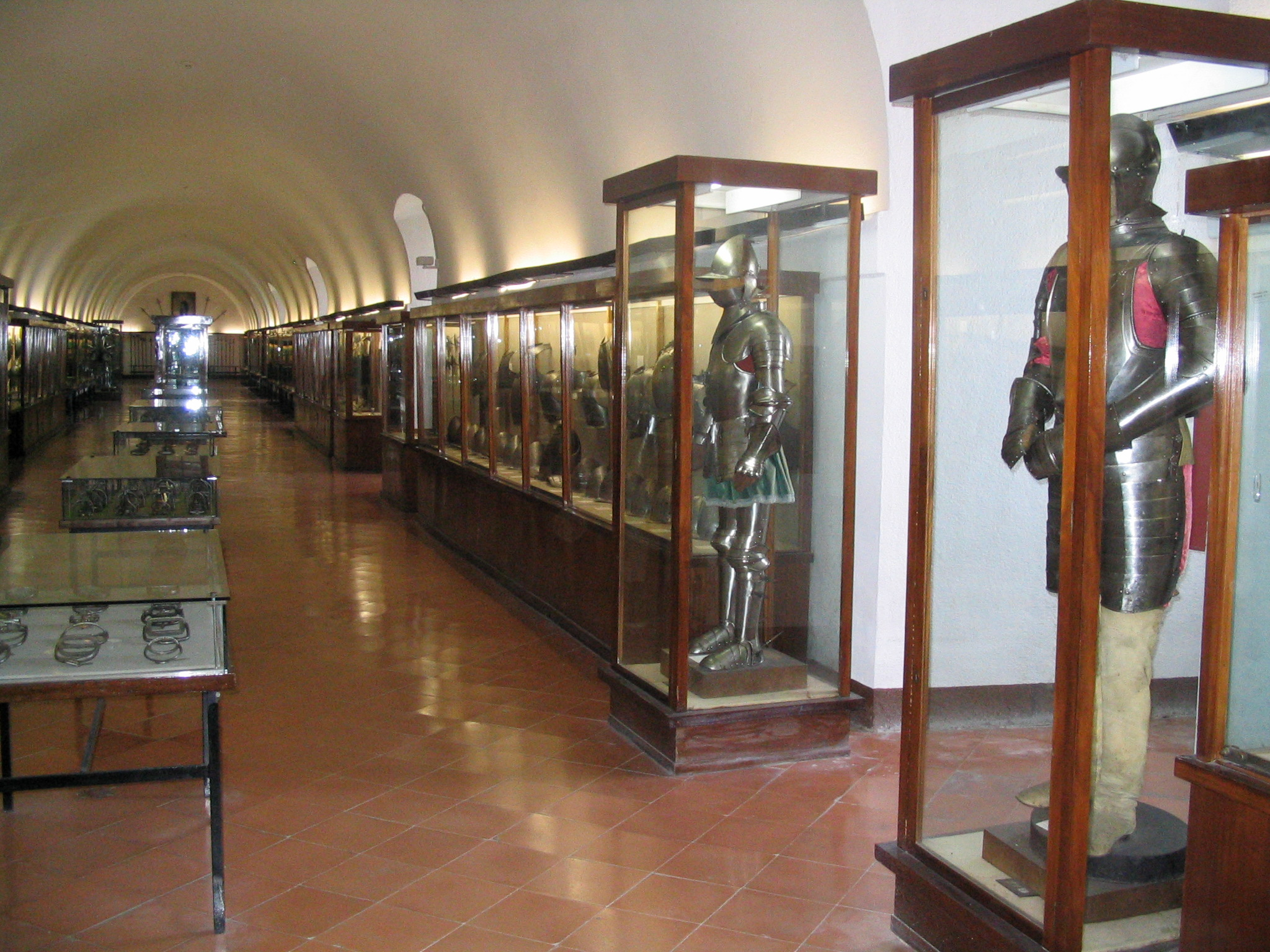
Museum installation

In the last 350 years Montjuïc Castle has played a decisive role in the history of Barcelona, becoming a symbol after the Catalan defeat to Spain in 1714. In the late 19th century, Montjuïc was synonymous with barbarism based on the torture of anarchists and others imprisoned there.

The castle is infamous in Catalan history books because of its role in the civil war from 1936 to 1939. Lluís Companys, who was the president of the Generalitat of Catalonia during the Spanish Civil War, was executed upon orders from the Spanish State at Montjuïc Castle in 1940.

Later in the 20th century, the castle became a military museum. In June 1963, Francisco Franco inaugurated the Military Armor Museum, the official name given to the institution.

== Current status ==
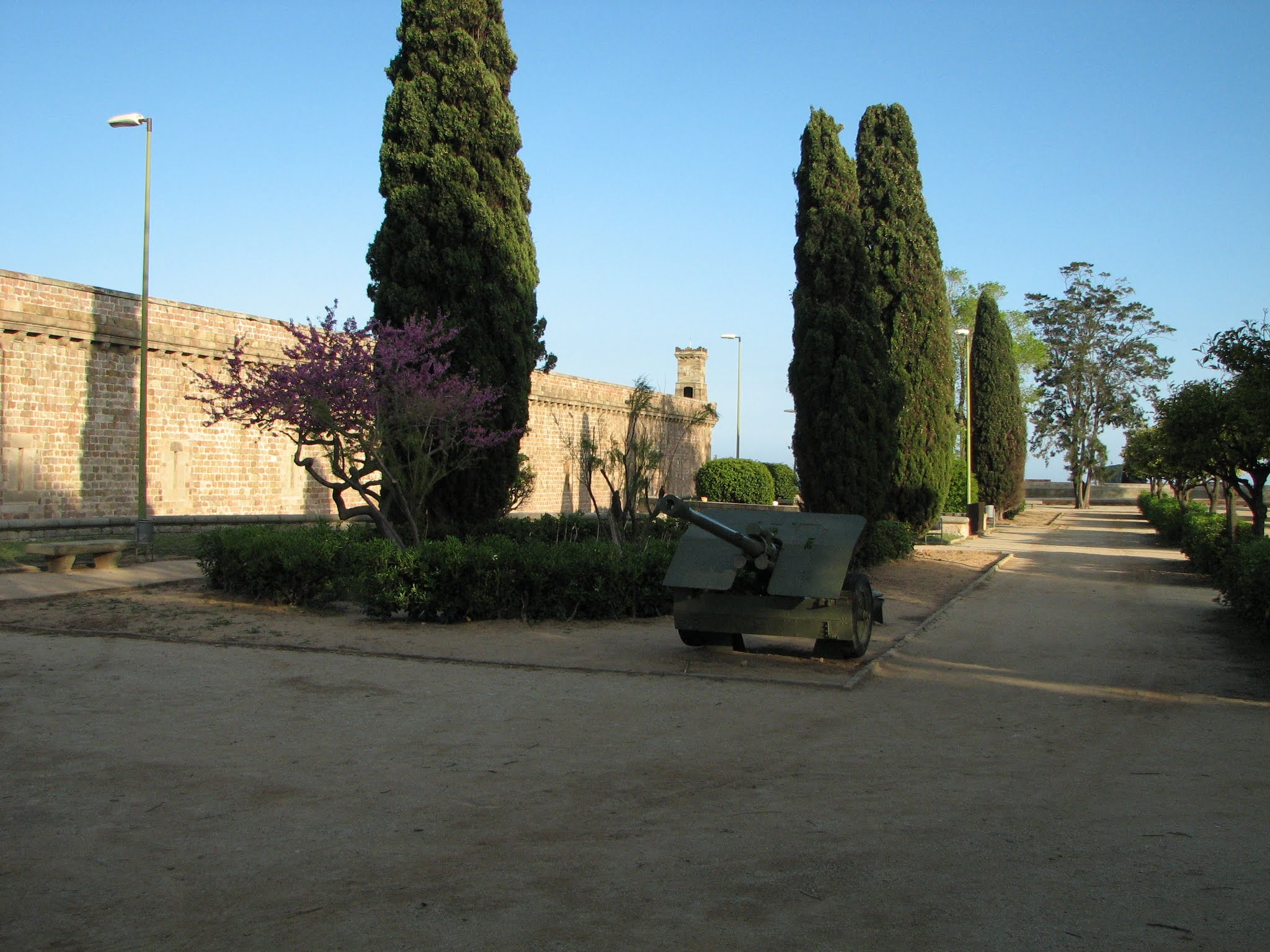
Montjuïc Castle view

In April 2007, the government transferred the castle to Barcelona City Council. Following discussions over the next months, the castle became a municipal facility. Subsequently, in 2010 the museum was closed and the City Council started a project of restoration and waterproofing of the roof and a watchtower.

The current plans for the castle include L’Espai de la Memòria, El Centre d’Interpretació de la Muntanya de Montjuïc, and cultural activities.

The castle can be accessed by the Montjuïc cable car, a gondola lift that has its upper station near the castle entrance. The Montjuïc funicular ascends Montjuïc from the Paral·lel station of the Barcelona Metro and connects to the lower station of the cable car. The castle can also be reached by the Port Vell Aerial Tramway from Port Vell, Barcelona's old harbour.

== See also ==
- Prototype metre
- Meridional definition
