= Torre Jaume I =

Coordinates: 41°22′19″N 2°10′48″E

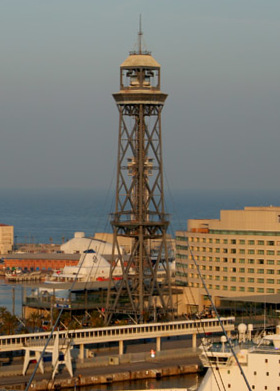
View of Torre Jaume I from Montjuïc

Torre Jaume I is a 107-metre (351 feet) high steel truss tower in Barcelona, Catalonia, Spain, which was built in 1931 by Carlos Boigas. The tower is currently the fifth tallest aerial lift pylon in the world and is a part of the Port Vell Aerial Tramway from Torre Sant Sebastia to Montjuïc. Torre Jaume I also has an observation platform.

== See also ==
- List of towers
- Aerial lift pylon
