= Montjuïc Funicular =

Funicular in Barcelona, Catalonia, Spain

Coordinates: 41.375°N 2.1686°E

Funicular de Montjuïc
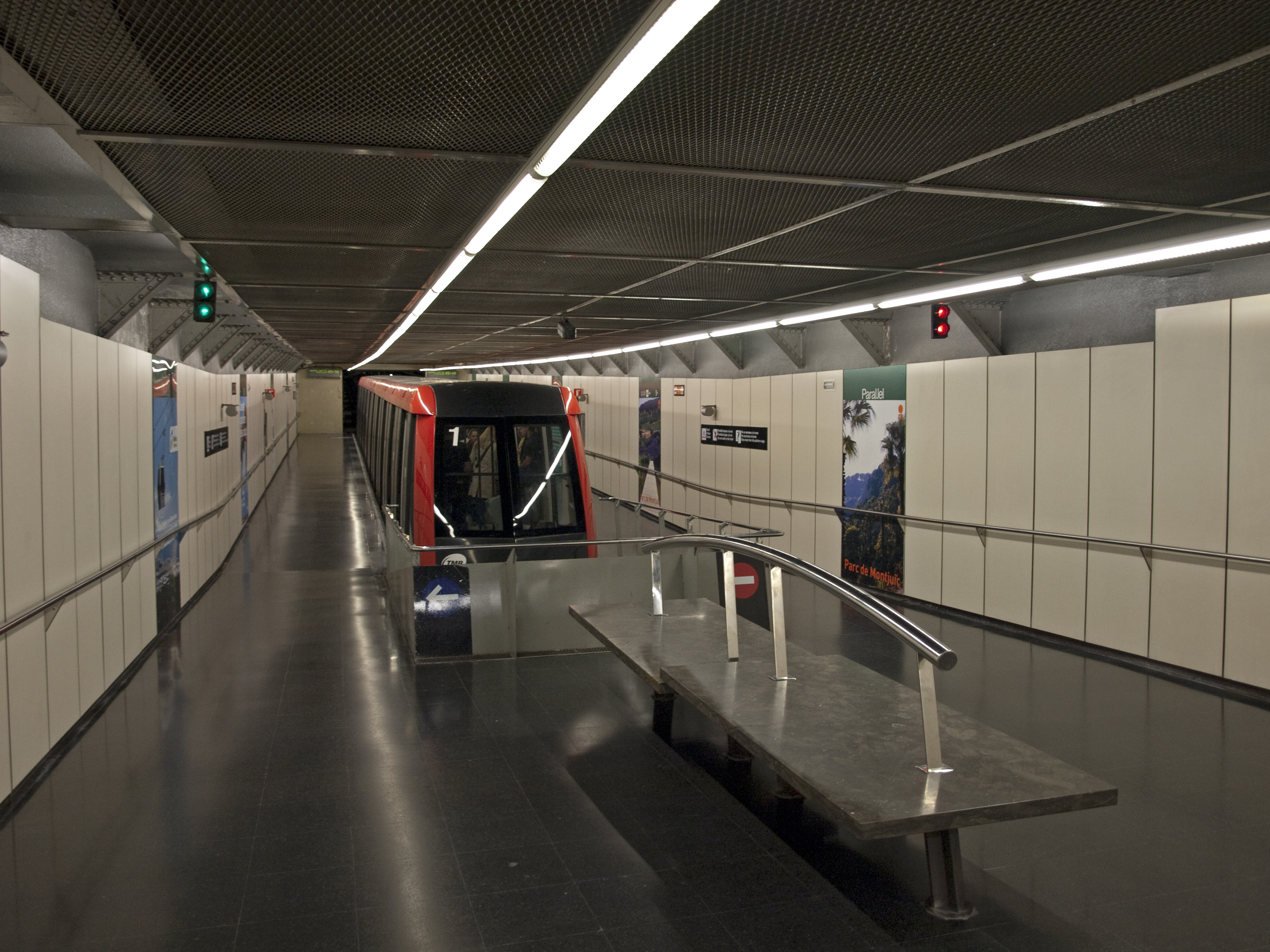
- The lower terminus in Paral·lel metro station

Overview
- Service type: Funicular
- Locale: Barcelona
- Current operator: TMB

Route
- Termini: Paral·lel; Parc de Montjuïc
- Distance travelled: 758 m (2,487 ft)
- Average journey time: 2 minutes

Technical
- Rolling stock: 2 3-car trainsets
- Track gauge: 1,200 mm (3 ft 11 1/4 in)

The Montjuïc Funicular (Catalan: Funicular de Montjuïc, Catalan: [funikuˈlar ðə ˌmonʒuˈik]; Spanish: Funicular de Montjuic, Spanish: [funikuˈlaɾ ðe moɲˈɟʝwik]) is a funicular railway in the city of Barcelona, in Catalonia, Spain. The railway mainly runs through a tunnel and connects the Barcelona Metro's Paral·lel station (with connections to lines L2 and L3) with the hill of Montjuïc and the various sporting facilities and other attractions there.

The upper station of the funicular is adjacent to the lower station of the Montjuïc Cable Car, a gondola lift that continues uphill to a terminal near the Montjuïc Castle at the summit of the hill. There is also a bus stop serviced by the 150 line which runs from the upper station of the funicular to the castle's summit and is part of the same fare network as the funicular, providing a free transfer to the castle as an alternative to the cable car.

== Overview ==
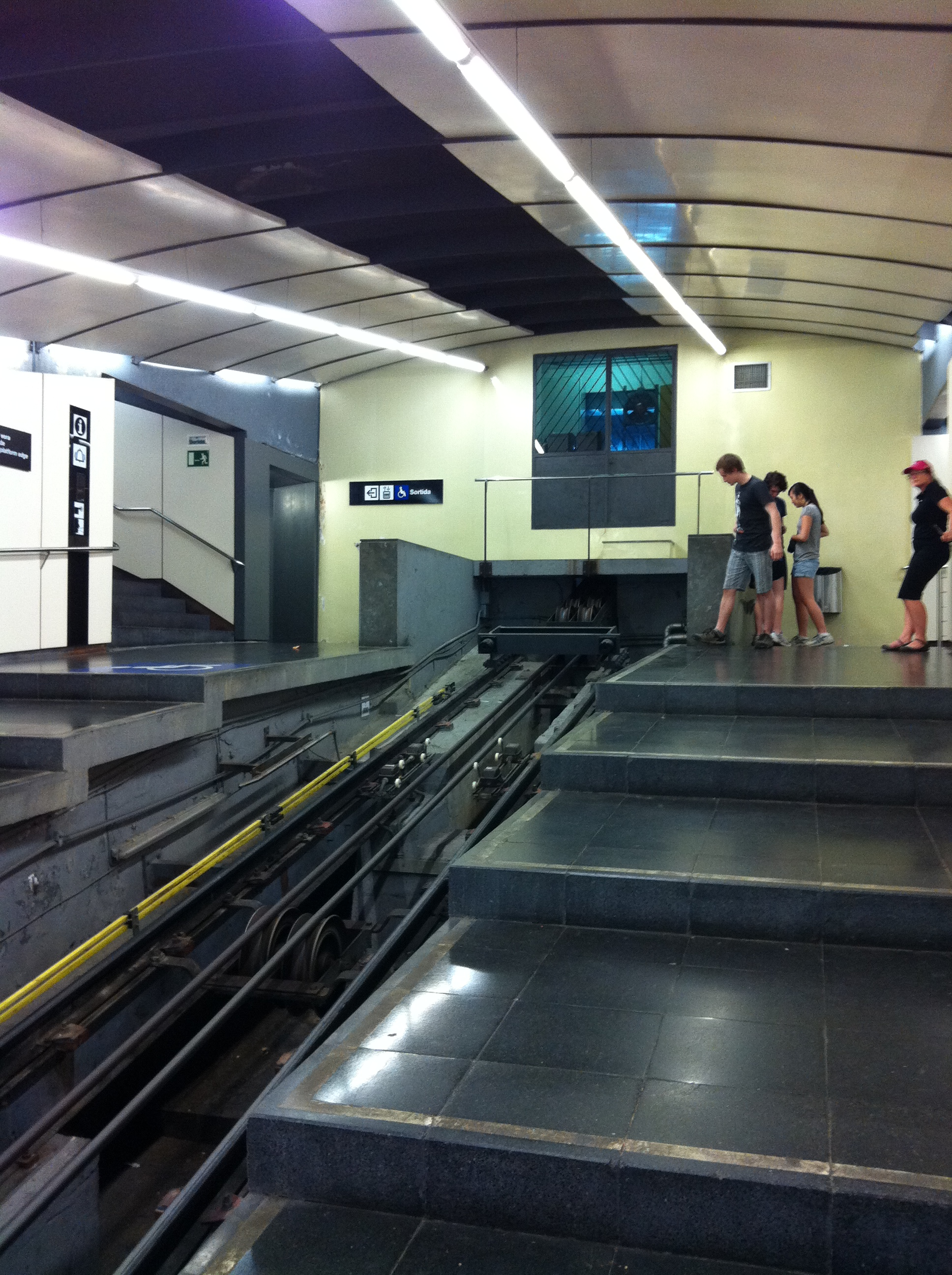
Parc de Montjuïc station, showing cables and control room

The funicular is part of the Autoritat del Transport Metropolità integrated fare network and is listed on maps as part of the metro network. It is operated by Transports Metropolitans de Barcelona (TMB), which also operates most of the metro lines.

The funicular is one of three funiculars in Barcelona. The other two are the Funicular de Vallvidrera and the Funicular del Tibidabo, neither of which is operated by TMB.

=== Technical parameters ===
The railway has a single track configuration with a passing loop between stations. The track is 758 metres (2,487 ft) long and rises 76 metres (249 ft) at a maximum 18% gradient. The railway has a maximum speed of 10 metres per second (32.8 ft/s).

== History ==
The railway was opened in 1928 in order to serve the 1929 Barcelona International Exposition. Until around 1970, the funicular included a second upper stage that linked the current upper station with Montjuïc Castle. This connection is now provided by the Montjuïc Cable Car.

In preparation for the 1992 Summer Olympics, the railway was extensively reconstructed that year in order to serve the Estadi Olímpic Lluís Companys stadium and other Olympic facilities that were built on the Montjuïc hill.

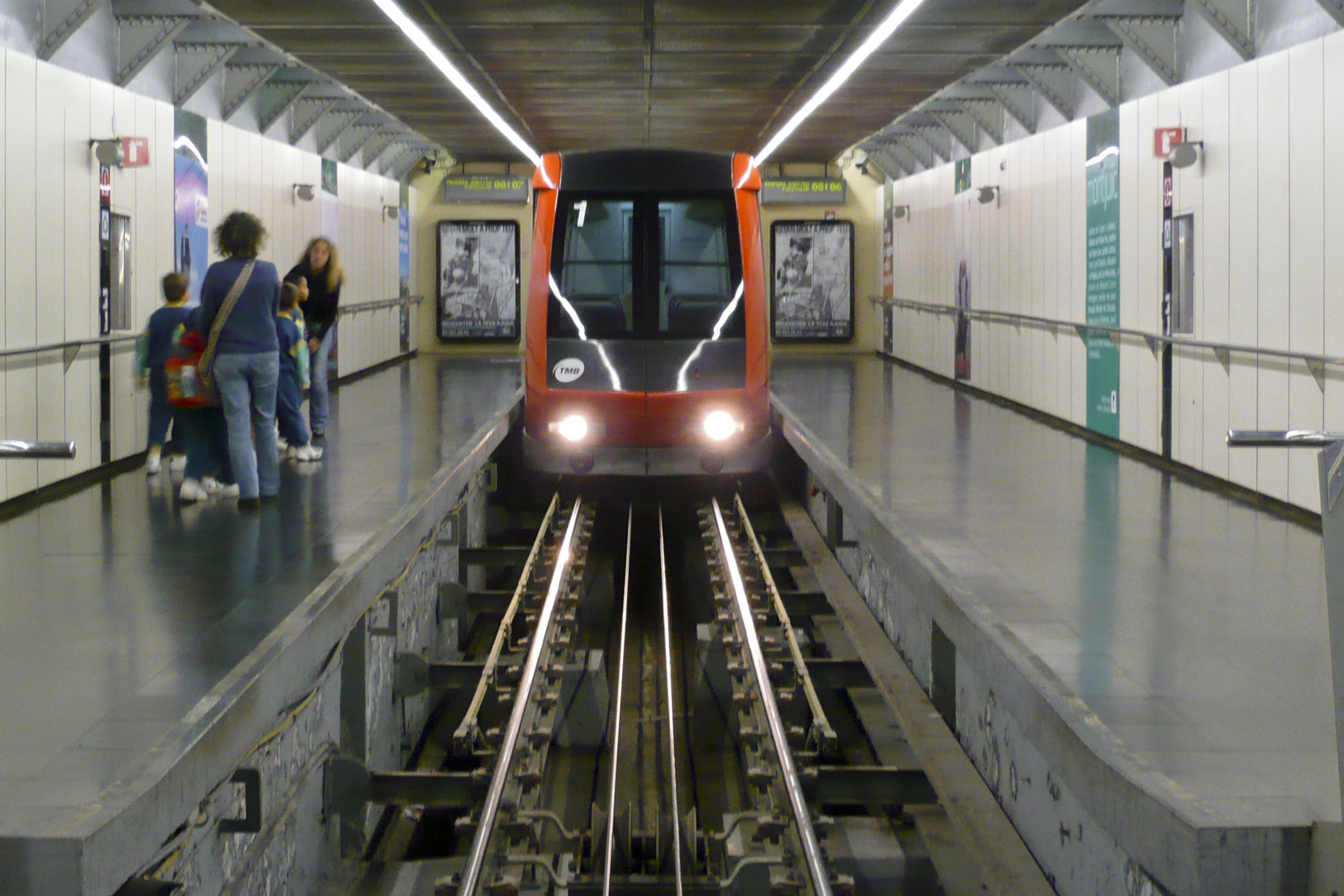
Car entering Paral·lel station, showing track and haulage cables

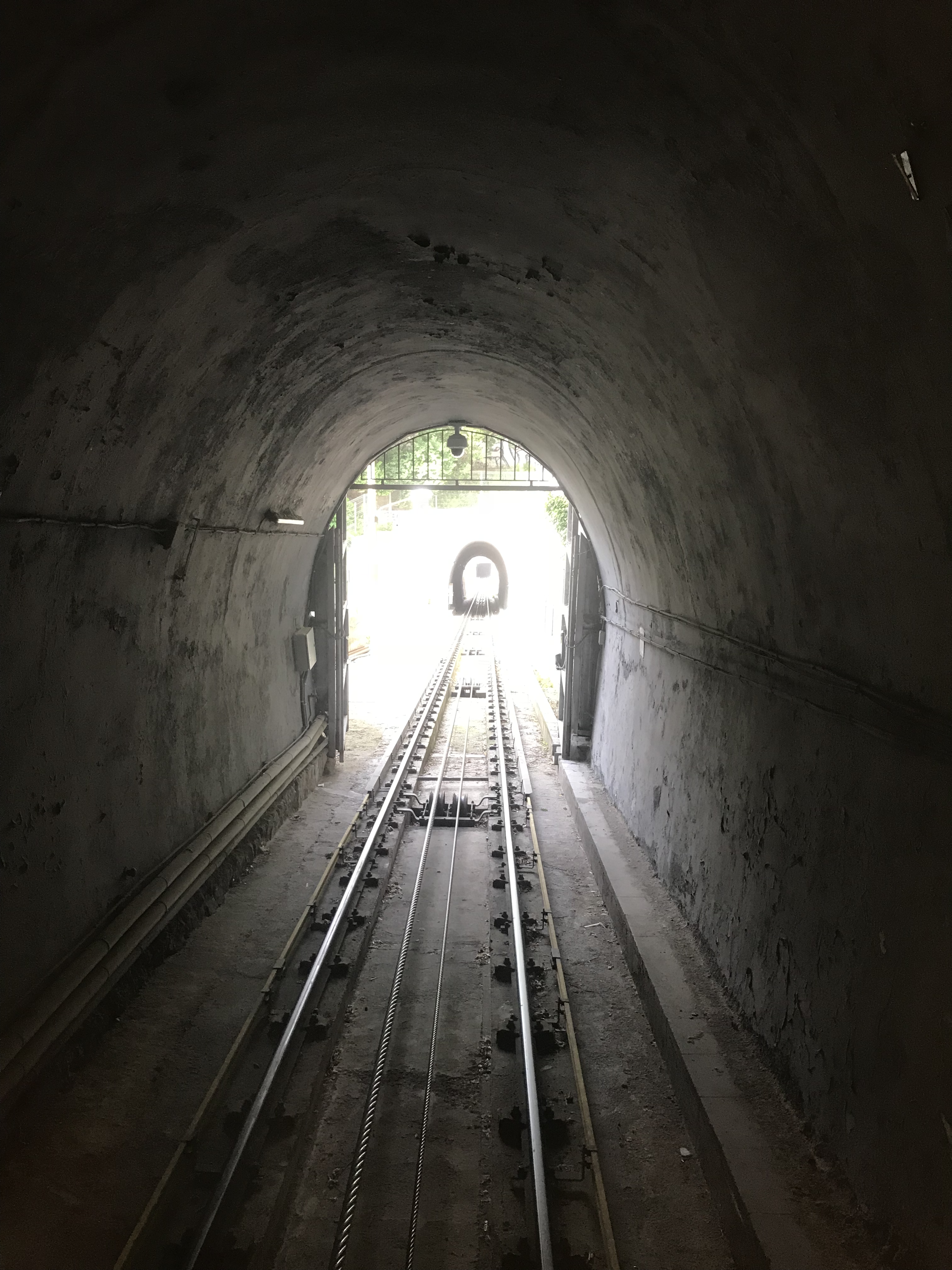
Riding the Montjuïc Funicular facing Paral·lel station
