= Port Vell =

Port of Barcelona (Spain)

Coordinates: 41°22′36.3″N 2°11′4.7″E

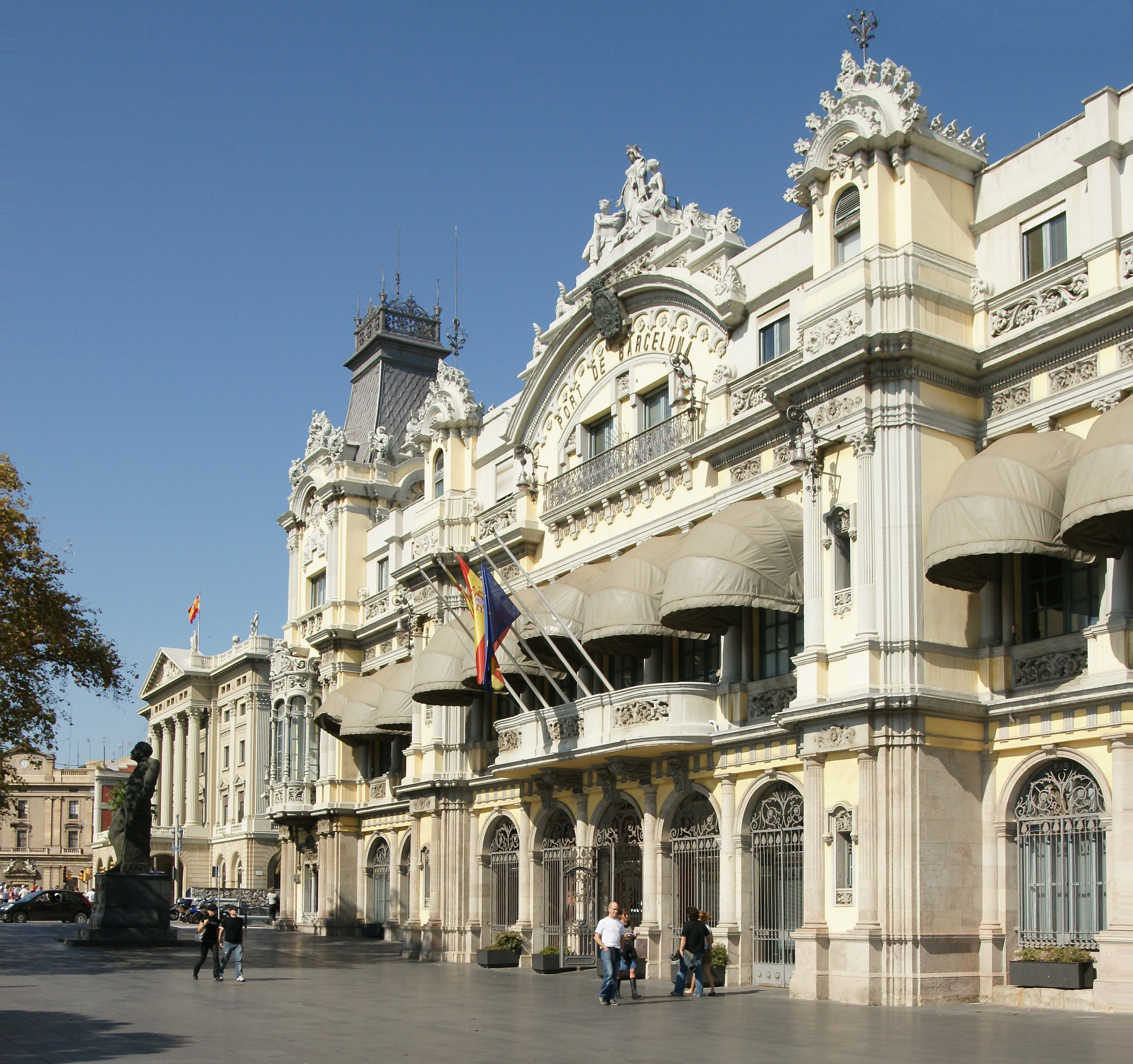
Barcelona's old Customs building

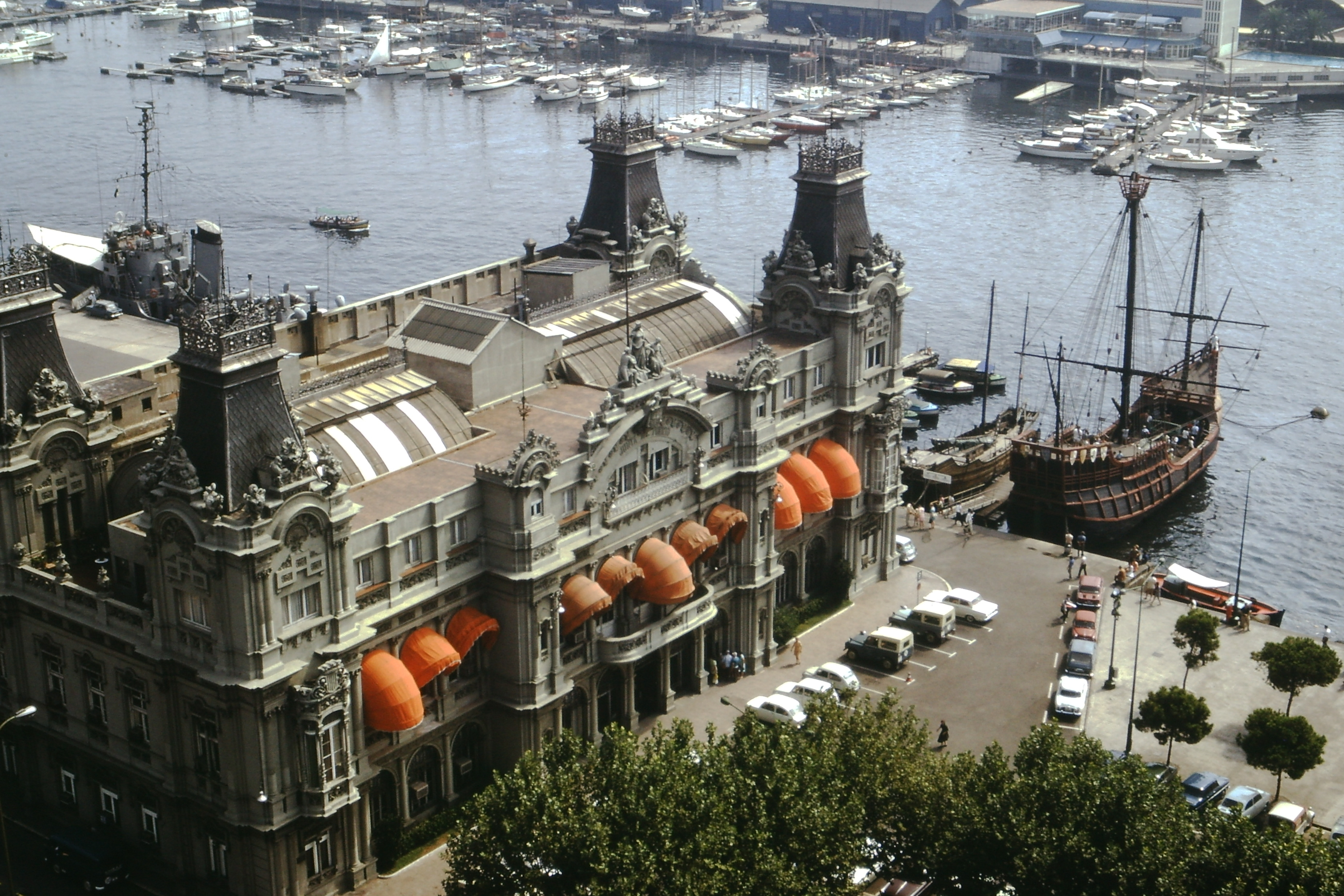
The old Customs building photo from 1971 shows Christopher Columbus' Santa Maria replica (no longer moored there), and missing the new Port Vell marina walkway

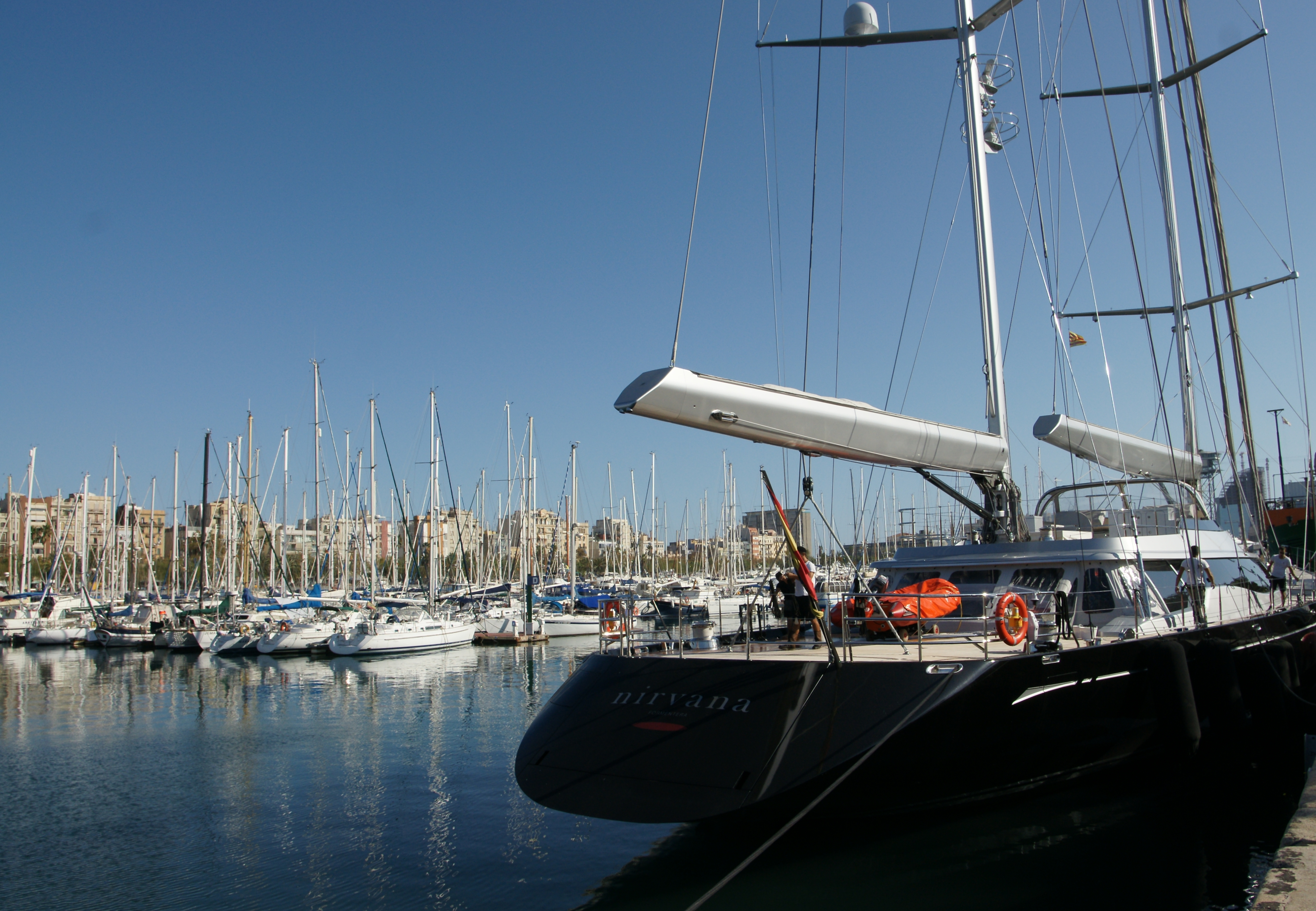
Port Vell's marina

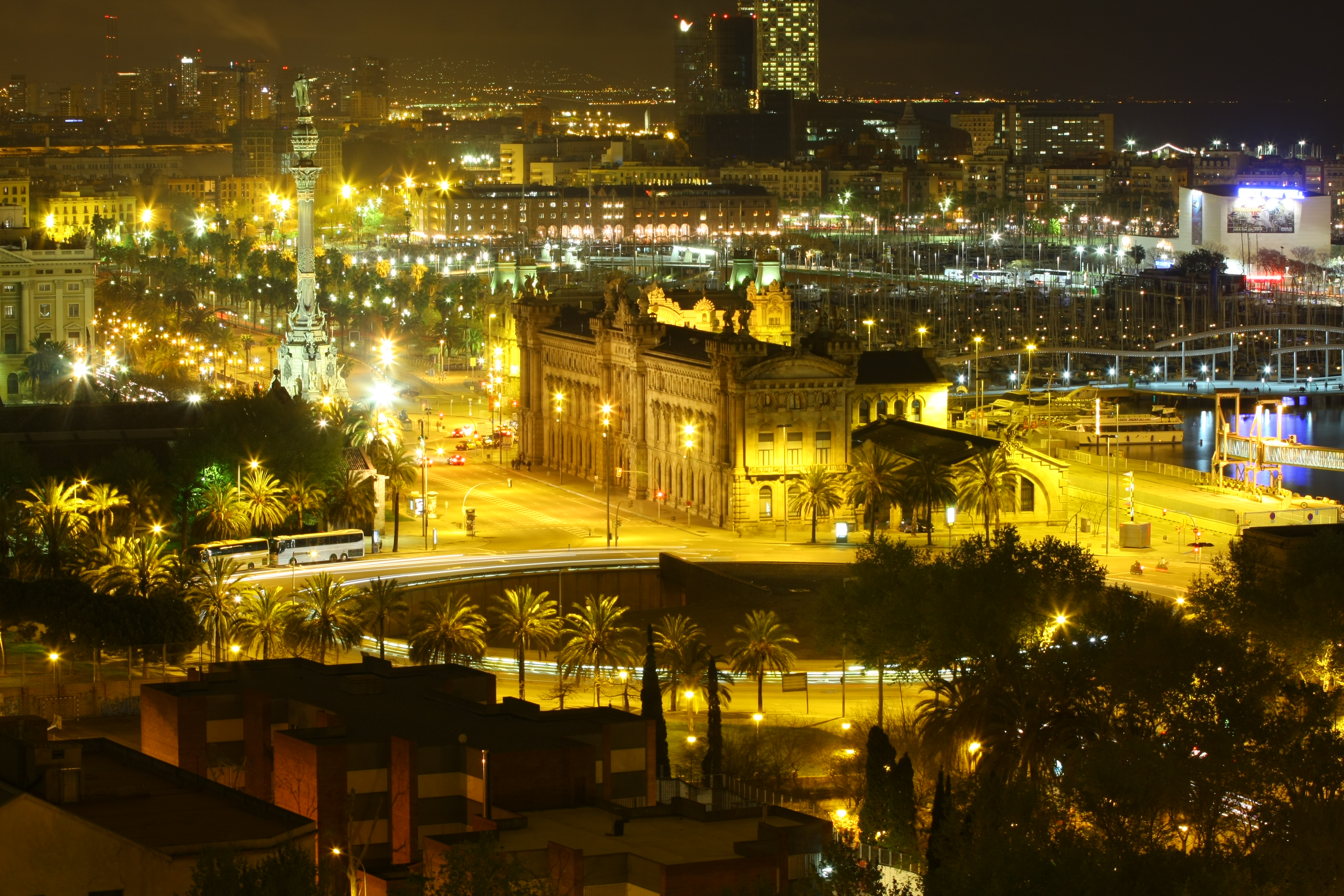
Port Vell at night

Port Vell (Catalan pronunciation: [ˈpɔɾd ˈbeʎ], literally in English "Old Harbor") is a waterfront harbor in Barcelona, Catalonia, Spain, and part of the Port of Barcelona. It was built as part of an urban renewal program prior to the 1992 Barcelona Olympics. Before this, it was a run-down area of empty warehouses, railroad yards, and factories. 16 million people visit the complex each year.

It is now a focal point of the city and tourist attraction, containing the Maremàgnum (a mall containing shops, a multiplex cinema, bars and restaurants), IMAX Port Vell and Europe's largest aquarium containing 8000 fish and 11 sharks contained in 22 basins filled with six million litres (1.6 million US gallons) of seawater. A pedestrian walkway, Rambla de Mar, connects La Rambla to Port Vell. It incorporates a swing bridge, in order to allow ships to enter and exit the harbour.

== History ==
=== Ancient history ===
Around the fourth century BCE Barcelona was occupied by the Laietani. A tribe of Iberian people who inhabited the coastline between the Llobregat and Tordera rivers. Barkeno, on Montjuïc, was their main settlement. These people traded with the Greek colony in Empúries, building large grain stores for the purpose.

In the first century CE, the Romans founded a colony, Barcino, on Mount Tàber. The first port activity took place on the northern side of Montjuïc.

The city and its maritime activities began to truly flourish and expand when Barcino's city walls were built after the Barbarian invasion in 263.

=== Middle ages and modern age ===
During the Late Middle Ages, Barcelona found itself on the frontier between Islam to the south and Christianity to the north. This strategic location was decisive in Barcelona's growth, for the city became established as a trading point between the two worlds and, eventually, the greatest maritime power in the Mediterranean, despite not possessing a port worthy of the name. The ships that anchored between the Royal Shipyards and the city were badly exposed to the great storms that often affected this coast and which caused many shipwrecks.

These storms made it extremely difficult to build an artificial harbour, because the huge amounts of sand and sediment deposited as a result of these phenomena damaged any work, whether ongoing or complete.

Work on the first successful project began in 1477. The enterprise entailed building a dock that would stretch as far as Maians Island, a sandy islet about 100 metres off the coast.

As the dike that sheltered the harbour was extended in various stages to the south and southwest of Maians Island, sand was also deposited in large quantities on the beach to the southeast of the Ciutadella. The Barceloneta neighbourhood was built on this new peninsula.

Despite the constant work to extend the dike (which reached what is now the Moll de Pescadors in 1723), in 1743 the huge amounts of sand that had accumulated finally collapsed the port. An enormous sandbank between the dike's end and what is now Plaça del Portal de la Pau made it necessary to close the port, trapping some of the anchored ships. The beacon in the Moll de Pescadors dock, was built a little later, in 1772.

In order to provide a definitive solution to the problem of harbor depth, work began in 1816 to extend the breakwater, which reached what is now the floating dike in 1882. However, a newly formed sandbank showed that even this was not sufficient, and the dike was enlarged once more, whilst an outer harbour wall was also built and the port mouth was moved to what is now the West Dock, or Moll de Ponent.

In 1868, the Barcelona authorities requested permission from the Development Ministry to constitute the Port of Barcelona Board of Public Works (Junta d'obres), which met for the first time in 1869. This institution continued to operate until 1978.

It was under the Board of Public Works that the port's structure was at last consolidated and the danger from sand and storms finally overcome.

Construction of the first "transversal" dock, where the Moll de Barcelona (Barcelona Dock) now stands, was completed in 1882. This dock later housed Torre Jaume I, the cable car tower for the Port Vell Aerial Tramway, built across the harbor for the 1929 Barcelona International Exposition, a World's fair, but opened only in 1931.

The Port continued to grow, stretching past Mount Montjuïc towards the Llobregat Delta with the construction of an inner harbour on the river bank, precisely where Barcelona's first port activity had its origins.

=== Recent times ===
The port's Statute of Autonomy was approved in 1978, when the site took on the official title of Autonomous Port of Barcelona, and in 1987, work began on drafting the Strategic Plan, an ambitious project to develop the whole port. Offices of public works were dissolved in 1992, and port authorities were established to replace them.

Under the Strategic Plan, the port is structured around three main areas: the commercial port, the logistical port and the old port. The plan pays particular attention to the last of these, the Port Vell, with a view to reviving a historic old site made obsolete by large-scale extension work in recent decades and relegated to serving traditional purposes.

Nowadays, the Port Vell is fully integrated into the city.

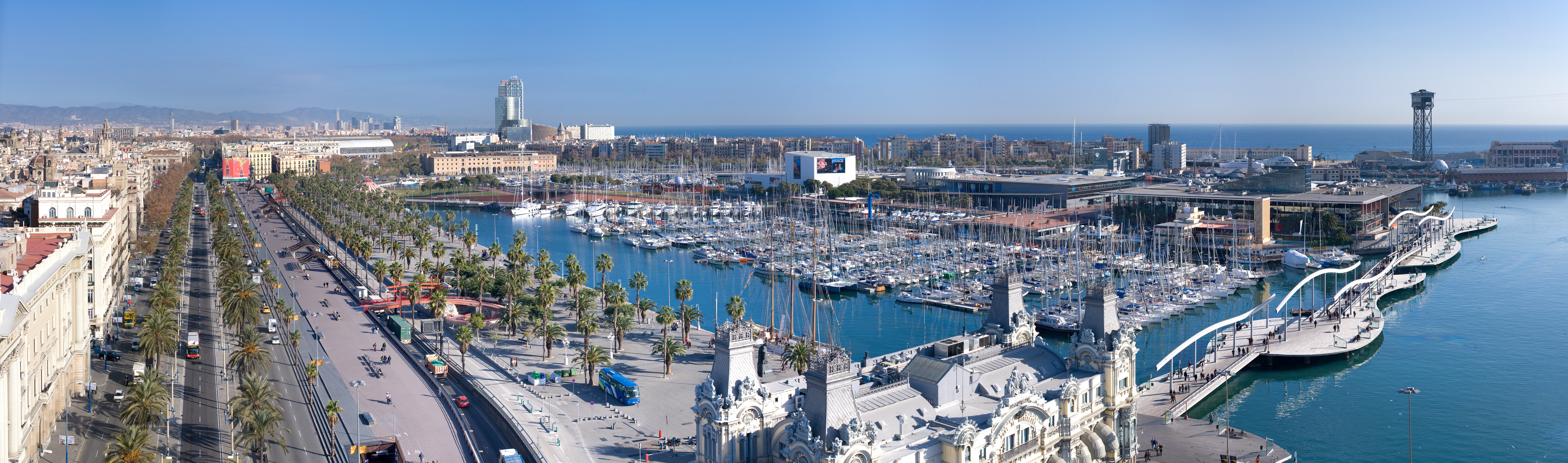
An aerial panoramic view from the Columbus Monument across Port Vell

== Other ports in Barcelona ==
- Port Olímpic
- Royal Barcelona Yacht Club

== Transport ==
- Barcelona Metro station Drassanes, on L3.
