= Montjuïc =

Hill in Barcelona, Spain

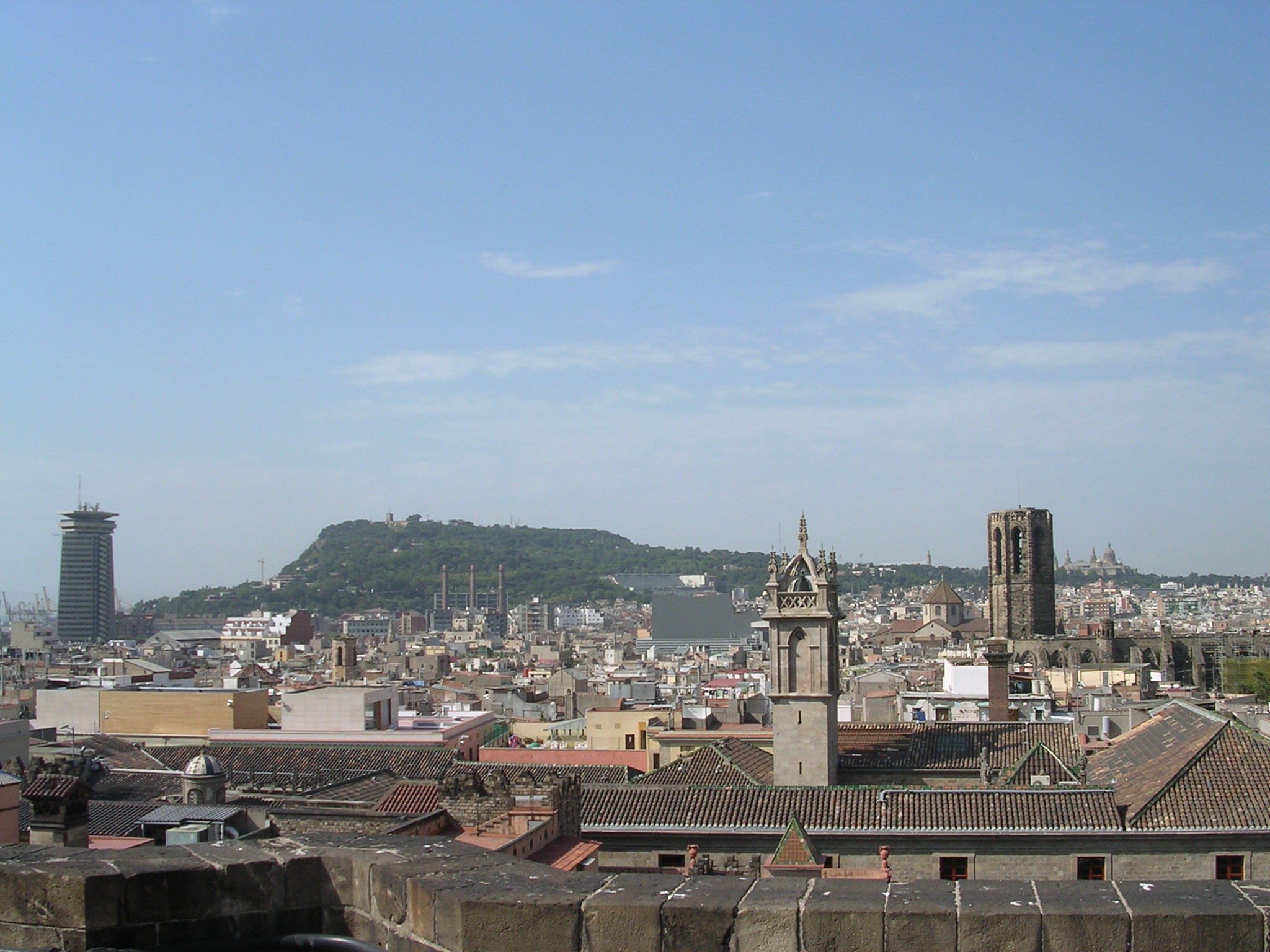

Highest point
- Elevation: 177.72 m (583.1 ft)
- Coordinates: 41°21′51″N 2°09′39″E

Geography
- Location within Catalonia

Montjuïc (Catalan pronunciation: [ˌmoɲʒuˈik], Spanish pronunciation: [moɲˈɟʝwik]) is a hill in Barcelona, Catalonia, Spain.

Montjuïc or Montjuich, meaning "Jewish Mountain" in medieval Latin and Catalan, is a broad, shallow hill in Barcelona with a rich history. It was the birthplace of the city, and its strategic location, between the Mediterranean and the Llobregat River, has made it significant throughout history. The hill has a medieval Jewish cemetery, declared an area of Cultural Asset of National Interest in 2007. Montjuïc has been the site of various fortifications, including the Castle of Montjuïc dating back to the 17th century. The area was also associated with political imprisonments and executions, and held significance during the Spanish Civil War.

The hill was chosen as the site for the 1929 International Exposition, which led to the construction of several buildings, including the Palau Nacional and the Estadi Olímpic. Montjuïc was also the location for several venues during the 1992 Summer Olympics, with the Olympic stadium as the centerpiece. The hill is now home to the Museu Nacional d'Art de Catalunya and various parks and gardens, and can be accessed via the Funicular de Montjuïc and the Montjuïc Cable Car.

== Etymology ==
Montjuïc translates to "Jewish Mountain" from medieval Latin and Catalan, and remains of a medieval Jewish cemetery have been found there. Some sources suggest that Montjuïc is related to the Latin phrase Mons Jovicus ('hill of Jove'). The city of Girona has a hill or mountain named Montjuïc just to the north of its old quarter with a similar history; its name is derived from the medieval Jewish cemetery that was there.

== History ==
Montjuïc, because of its strategic location on the Mediterranean, and alongside an important river communication channel, the Llobregat River, was the birthplace of the city of Barcelona. Archaeological discoveries have added greatly to the history of Barcelona. During the Iberian period, and especially during the Roman period Montjuïc became the main quarry of Barcelona, drastically changing the shape of the mountain.

On March 15, 2007, the General Directorate of Heritage of the Generalitat of Catalonia, in accordance with the Catalan Cultural Heritage Law (Law 9/1993, of September 30), declared Montjuic an area of Cultural Asset of National Interest (BCIN), due to the existence of the medieval Jewish cemetery in Barcelona, considered the largest in Europe of its time.

== Description ==
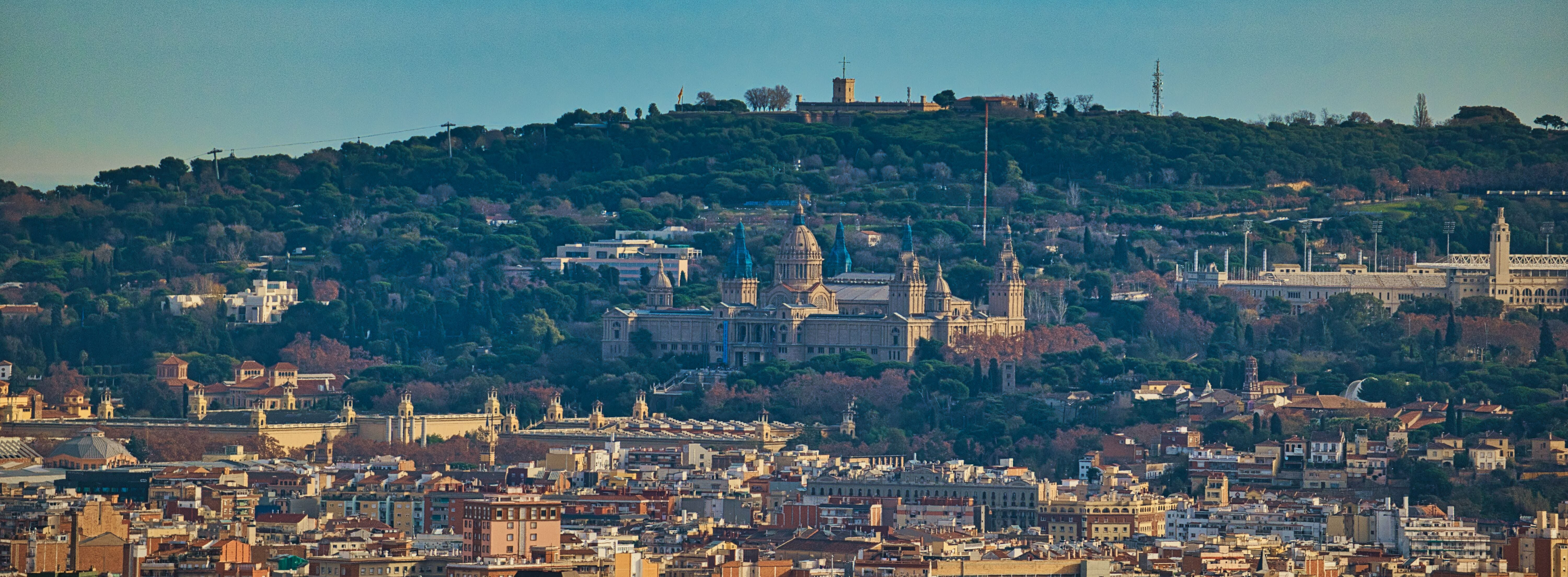
Picture of Montjuïc taken from the Finestrelles scenic viewpoint.

Barcelona's Montjuïc is a broad shallow hill with a relatively flat top overlooking the harbour, to the southwest of the city centre. The eastern side of the hill is almost a sheer cliff, giving it a commanding view over the city's harbour immediately below. The top of the hill (a height of 184.8 m) was the site of several fortifications, the latest of which (the Castle of Montjuïc) remains today. The fortress largely dates from the 17th century, with 18th-century additions.

In 1842, the garrison (loyal to the Madrid government) shelled parts of the city. It served as a prison, often holding political prisoners, until the time of General Franco. The castle was also the site of numerous executions. In 1897, an incident popularly known as the Montjuïc trial prompted the execution of anarchist supporters and led to a severe repression of the struggle for workers' rights. During this era, "Montjuïc" was synonymous with barbarism based on the torture of anarchists and others imprisoned there.

On different occasions during the Spanish Civil War, both Nationalists and Republicans were executed there, each at the time when the site was held by their opponents. The former president of the Generalitat de Catalunya Lluís Companys was also executed there in 1940, having been extradited to the Franco government by the Nazis.

== Developments ==
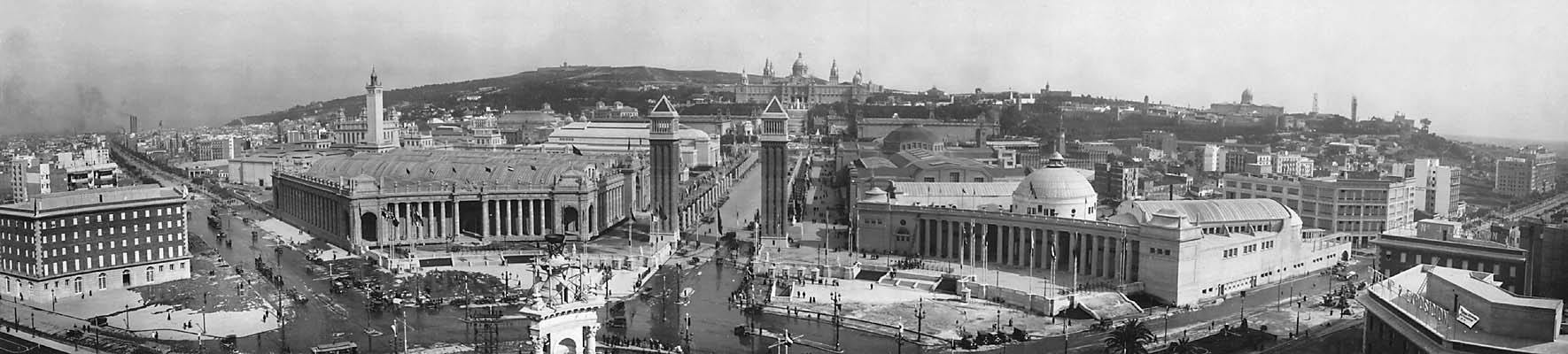
Panorama of the 1929 Barcelona International Exposition

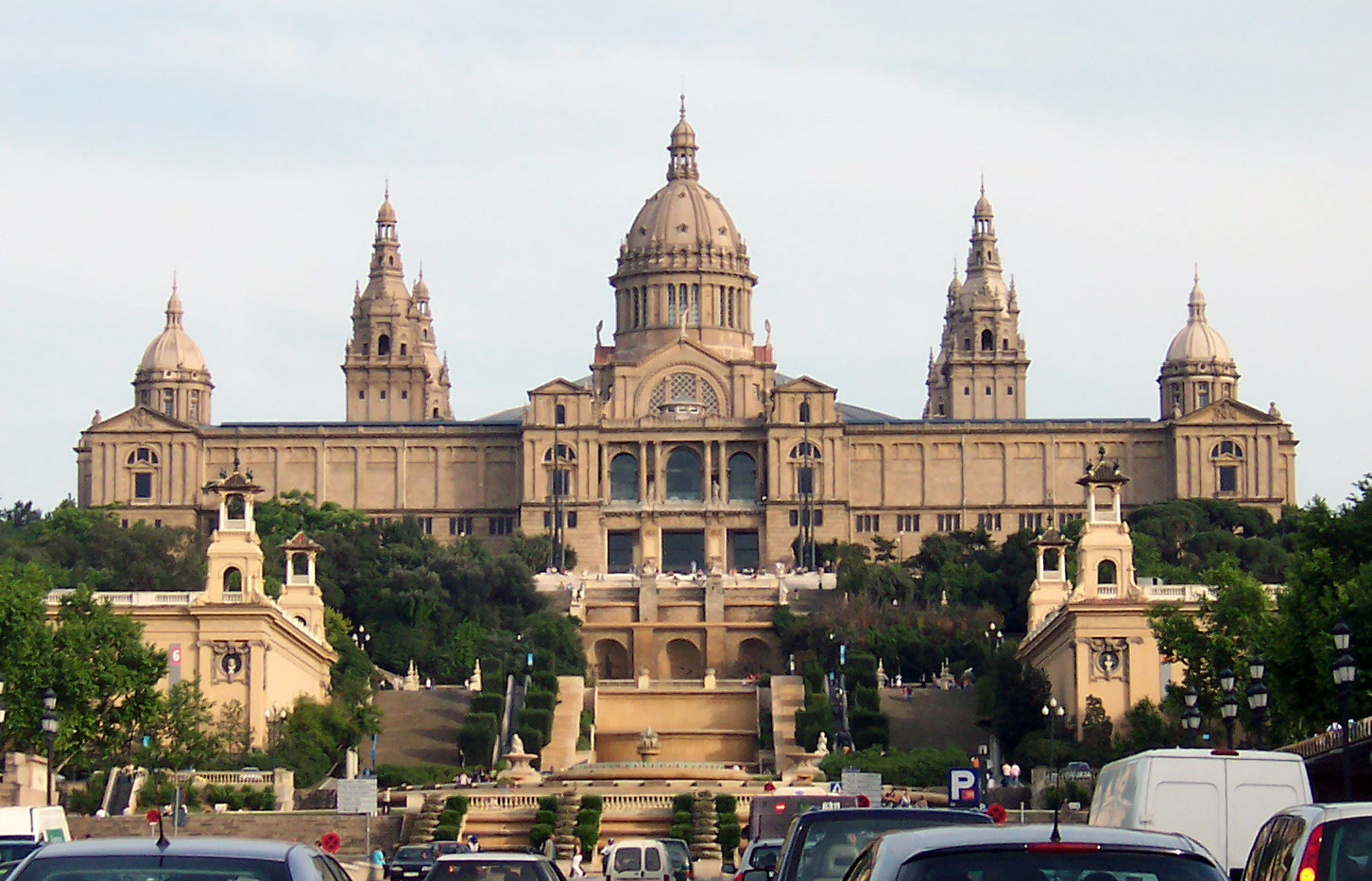
The Palau Nacional

The view over Barcelona from outside the Palau Nacional on Montjuïc.

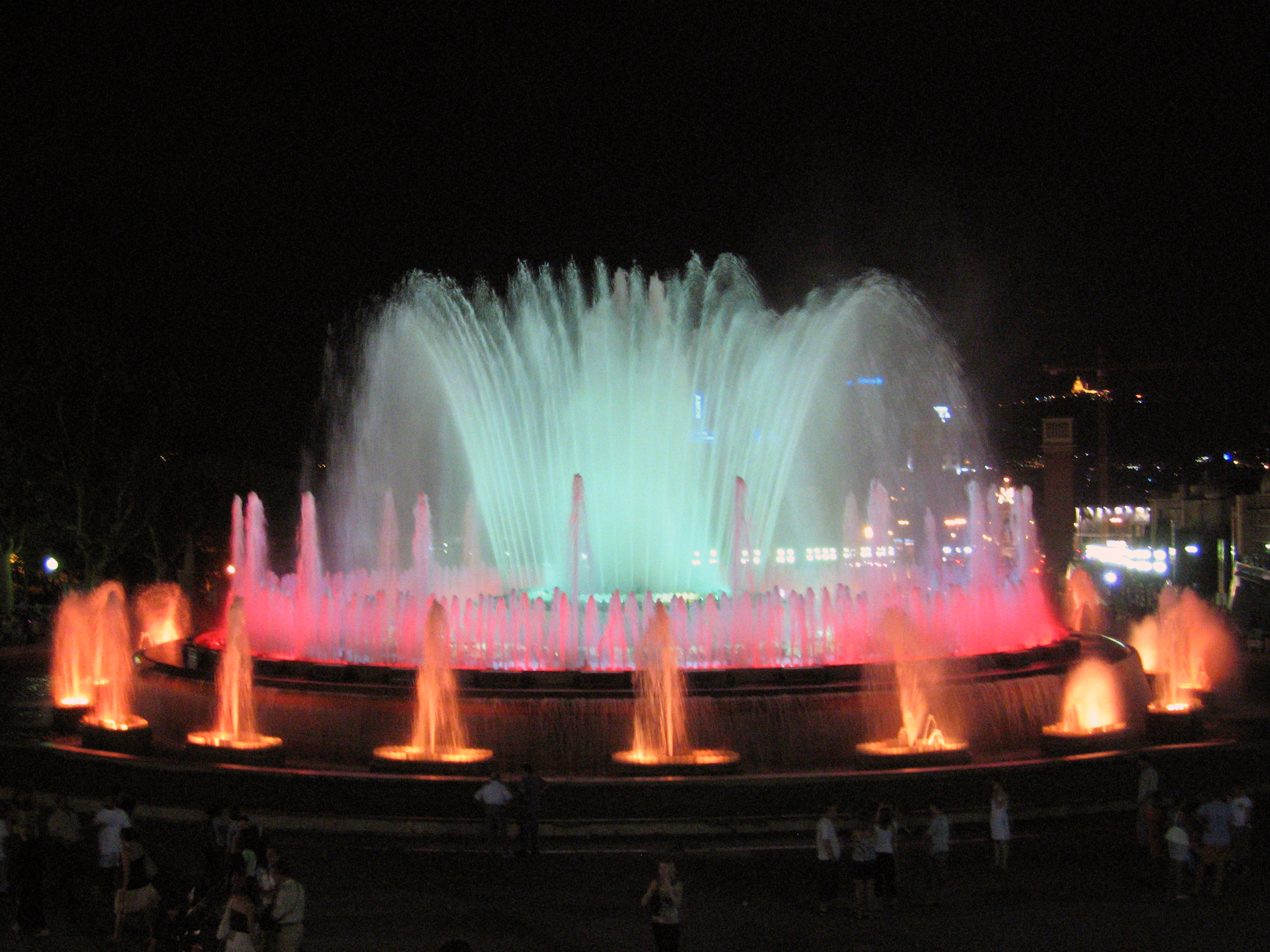
Magic Fountain of Montjuïc

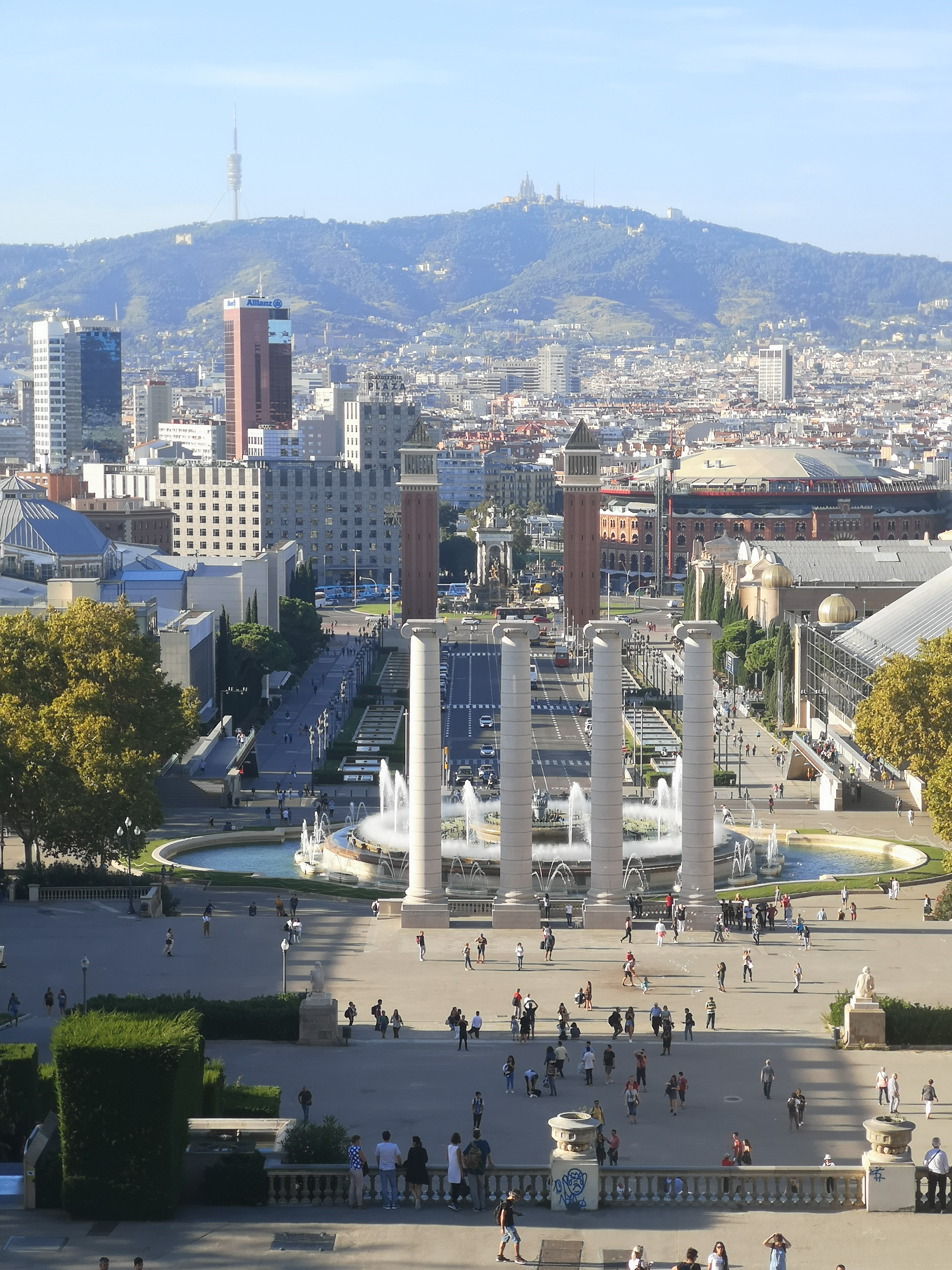
View from Montjuic

Naturally wooded, the slopes of the Montjuïc were traditionally used to grow food and graze animals by the people of the neighbouring Ciutat Vella. In the 1890s, the forests were partially cleared, opening space for parklands. The site was selected to host the 1929 International Exposition (a World's Fair), for which the first large-scale construction on the hill began. The surviving buildings from this effort include the grand Palau Nacional, the Estadi Olímpic (the Olympic stadium), the ornate Magic Fountain of Montjuïc (Font Màgica), and a grand staircase leading up from the foot of Montjuïc at the south end of the Avinguda de la Reina Maria Cristina, past the Font Màgica and through the Plaça del Marquès de Foronda and the Plaça de les Cascades to the Palau Nacional.

The Poble Espanyol, a "Spanish village" of different buildings built in different styles of Spanish architecture, also survives, located on the western side of the hill. Mies van der Rohe's German national pavilion was constructed at the foot of the hill, near the Plaça del Marquès de Foronda. It was demolished in 1930 but was rebuilt in 1988.

Also completed in 1929, the Olympic stadium was intended to host an anti-fascist alternative Olympics in 1936, in opposition to the 1936 Berlin Olympics. These plans were cancelled due to the outbreak of the Spanish Civil War. The stadium served as the home for football team Espanyol, until the club left for a new stadium in Cornellà/El Prat upon its completion in 2008. FC Barcelona are currently tenants while their stadium, Camp Nou, is redeveloped.

The roads in the slopes facing the city were once the Montjuïc circuit Formula One race track, hosting the Spanish Grand Prix on four occasions. However, a terrible accident in the 1975 race saw Rolf Stommelen's car crash into the stands, killing four people; as a result the Spanish Grand Prix never returned to Montjuïc circuit.

One of the roads to the summit served as part of the route of the Escalada a Montjuic professional/elite bicycle race (1965-2007).

Montjuïc was selected as the site for several of the venues of the 1992 Summer Olympics, centred on the Olympic stadium. Extensively refurbished and renamed the Estadi Olímpic Lluís Companys, the 65,000-seat stadium saw the opening and closing ceremonies and hosted the athletic events. Around it the Anella Olímpica (the "Olympic Ring") of sporting venues was built, including the Palau Sant Jordi indoor arena, the Institut Nacional d'Educació Física de Catalunya state, a centre of sports science; the Piscines Bernat Picornell and the Piscina Municipal de Montjuïc, the venues for swimming and diving events respectively; and the striking telecommunications tower, designed by the architect Santiago Calatrava. Of the Piscines (swimming pools), the diving pool was selected as the setting for the "Slow" music video recorded in 2003 by Australian singer Kylie Minogue.

The ornate Palau Nacional houses the Museu Nacional d'Art de Catalunya, an extensive showcase of Catalan painting and sculpture.

The top of the hill can be reached using the Funicular de Montjuïc, a funicular railway that operates as part of the Barcelona Metro, and then the Montjuïc Cable Car, a gondola lift. On the eastern slope is the Miramar terminal of the Port Vell Aerial Tramway connecting Montjuïc with Barceloneta on the other side of Port Vell. Part of the slopes are covered with a well attended park and gardens. The hill is often used for amateur cycling.

== Prototype metre ==
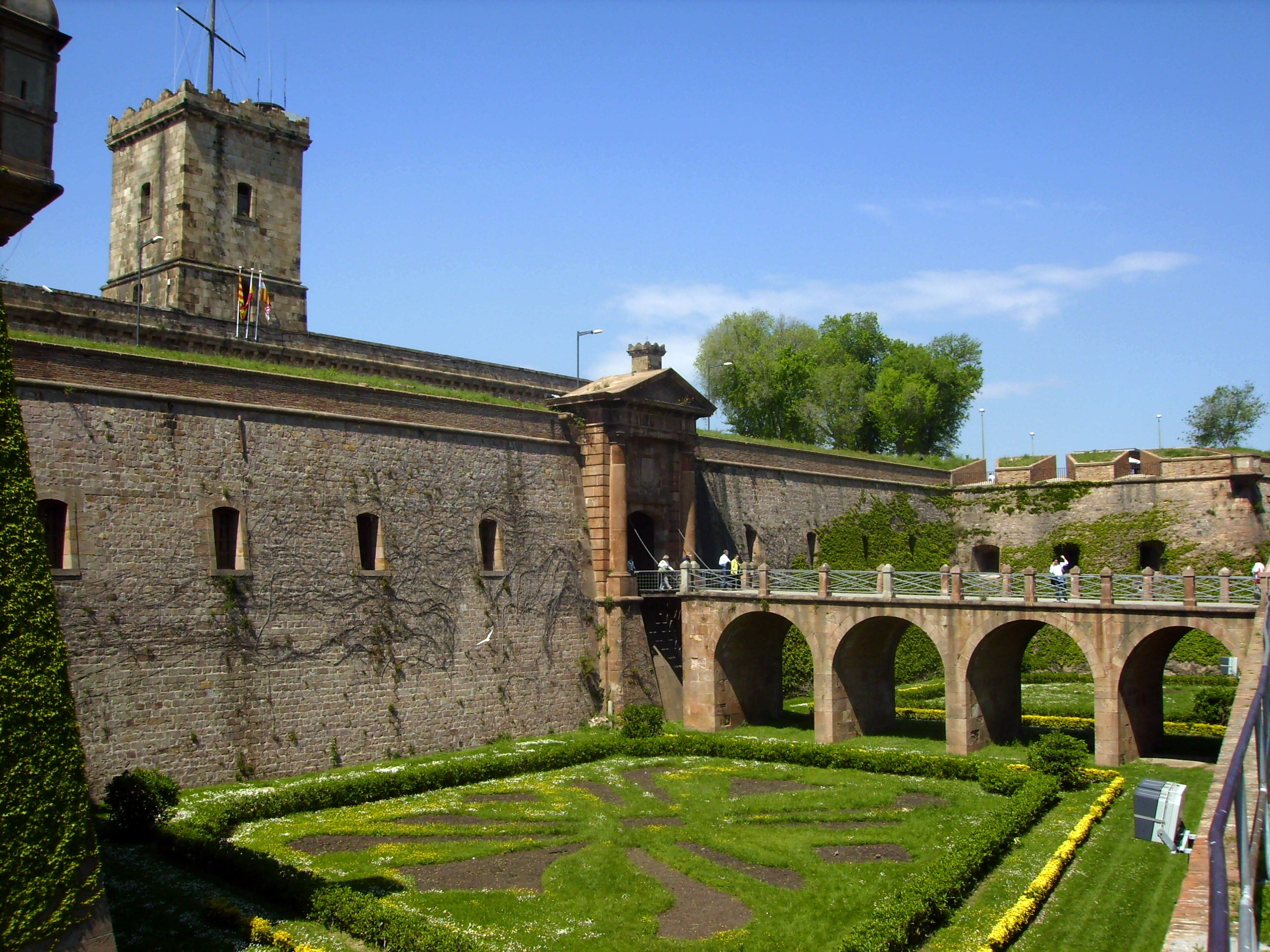
The fortress at Montjuïc that was the most southerly point from which measurements were made when constructing the prototype metre

In June 1792 the French astronomers Jean Baptiste Joseph Delambre and Pierre François André Méchain set out to measure the meridian arc distance from Dunkirk to Barcelona, two cities lying on approximately the same longitude as each other and also the longitude through Paris. The fortress on Montjuïc was chosen as the reference point in Barcelona. After protracted negotiations (France and Spain were technically at war) Méchain made his measurements from the fortress on 16 March 1794.

Using this measurement and the latitudes of the two cities they could calculate the distance between the North Pole and the Equator in classical French units of length and hence produce the first prototype metre which was defined as being one ten millionth of that distance. The definitive metre bar, manufactured from platinum, was presented to the French legislative assembly on 22 June 1799.

== Landmarks and attractions ==
- Fundació Joan Miró, a modern art museum centring on a large collection of the works of Joan Miró
- Montjuïc Cemetery (Cementiri del Sud-Oest), a cemetery containing many influential people, including Lluís Companys, and his predecessor as President of Catalonia Francesc Macià, as well as artists such as the painter Joan Miró, the dancer Carmen Amaya and the poet and priest Jacint Verdaguer. Numerous unmarked graves hold those executed in the fortress

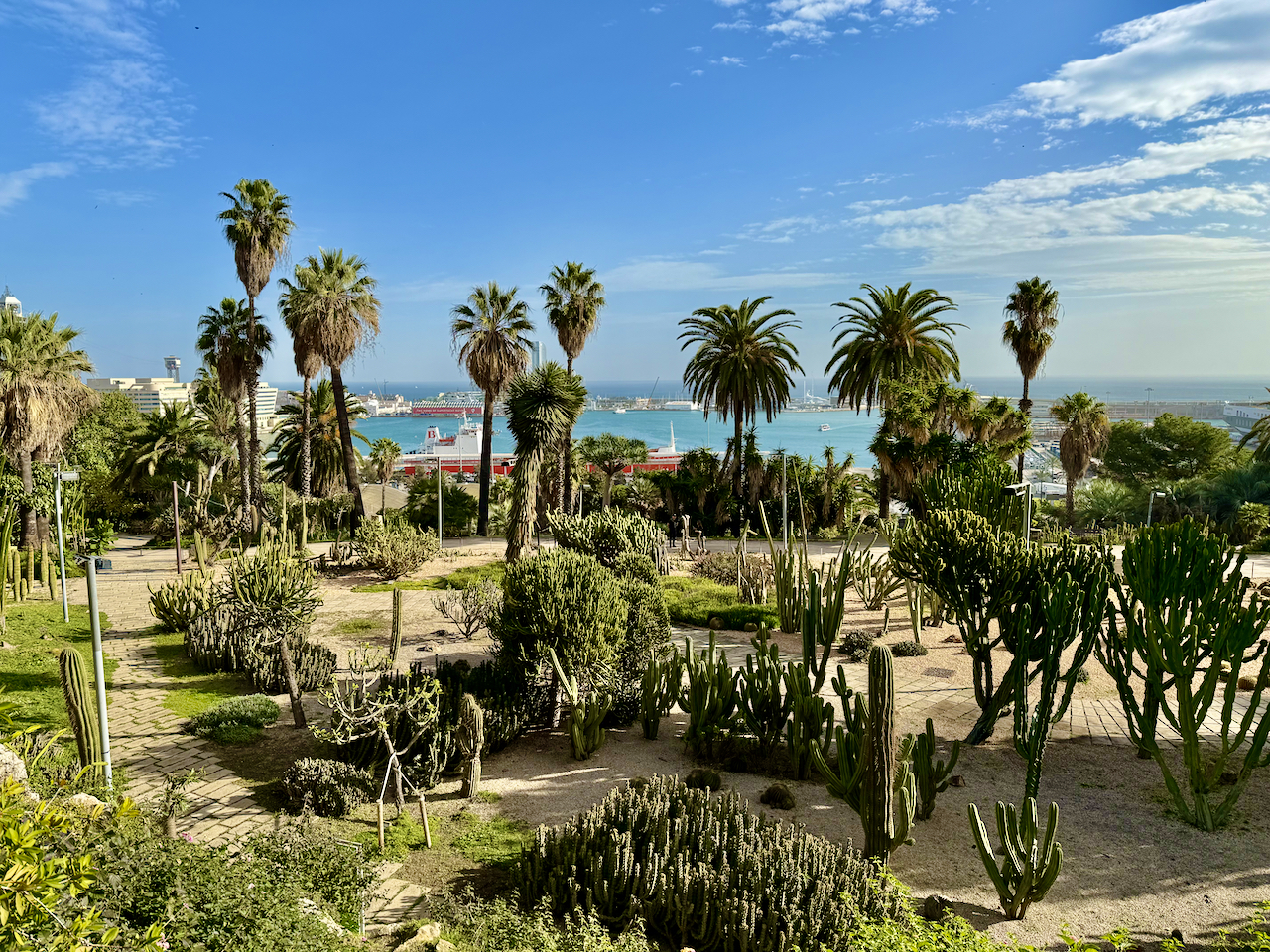
Mossèn Costa i Llobera Gardens in Montjuïc

- The botanical gardens of Barcelona
- The Mossèn Costa i Llobera Gardens
- The museum of ethnology
- The Catalan museum of archaeology (housed in the 1929 exhibition's palace of graphic arts)
- The Olympic and Sports Museum Joan Antoni Samaranch

== Musical tributes ==
In 1936, the British composers Lennox Berkeley and Benjamin Britten visited a folk dance festival on the mountain while attending a music festival in Barcelona. They took down the melodies and the following year they jointly wrote a suite of four Catalan dances for orchestra, which they named Mont Juic.

A track called "Montjuic" was released on the 2021 album Polydans by German musician Roosevelt.

== See also ==
- Parks and gardens of Barcelona
- Public art in Barcelona
- History of Barcelona
- The Four Columns
- Siege of Barcelona (1713–1714)
- Urban planning of Barcelona
