= Domenach =

Domenach is a French surname. Notable people with the surname include:

- Denise Domenach-Lallich (1924–2020), French resistance member
- Jean-Luc Domenach (1945-2026), French historian, sinologist, and political scientist
- Jean-Marie Domenach (1922–1997), French writer and intellectual

== See also ==
- Domenech
