= Domene (surname) =

Domene is a surname. Notable people with the surname include:

- Carmen Domene, Spanish academic
- Dario Dómene (born 1970), Argentine retired footballer
- Francisco Domene (born 1960), Spanish writer
- Ramón Domene (born 1990), Spanish cyclist
- Sandra Domene (born 2000), Spanish water polo player
- Tomás Domene (born 1997), Argentine field hockey player

== See also ==
- Domenech
