= Enric Sagnier =

Spanish architect (1858–1931)

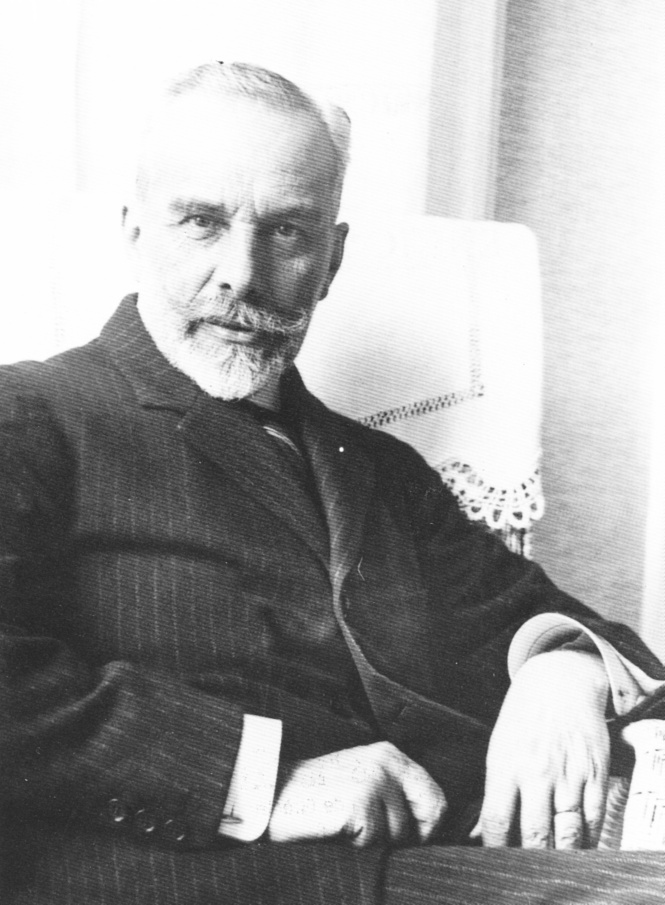
Enric Sagnier

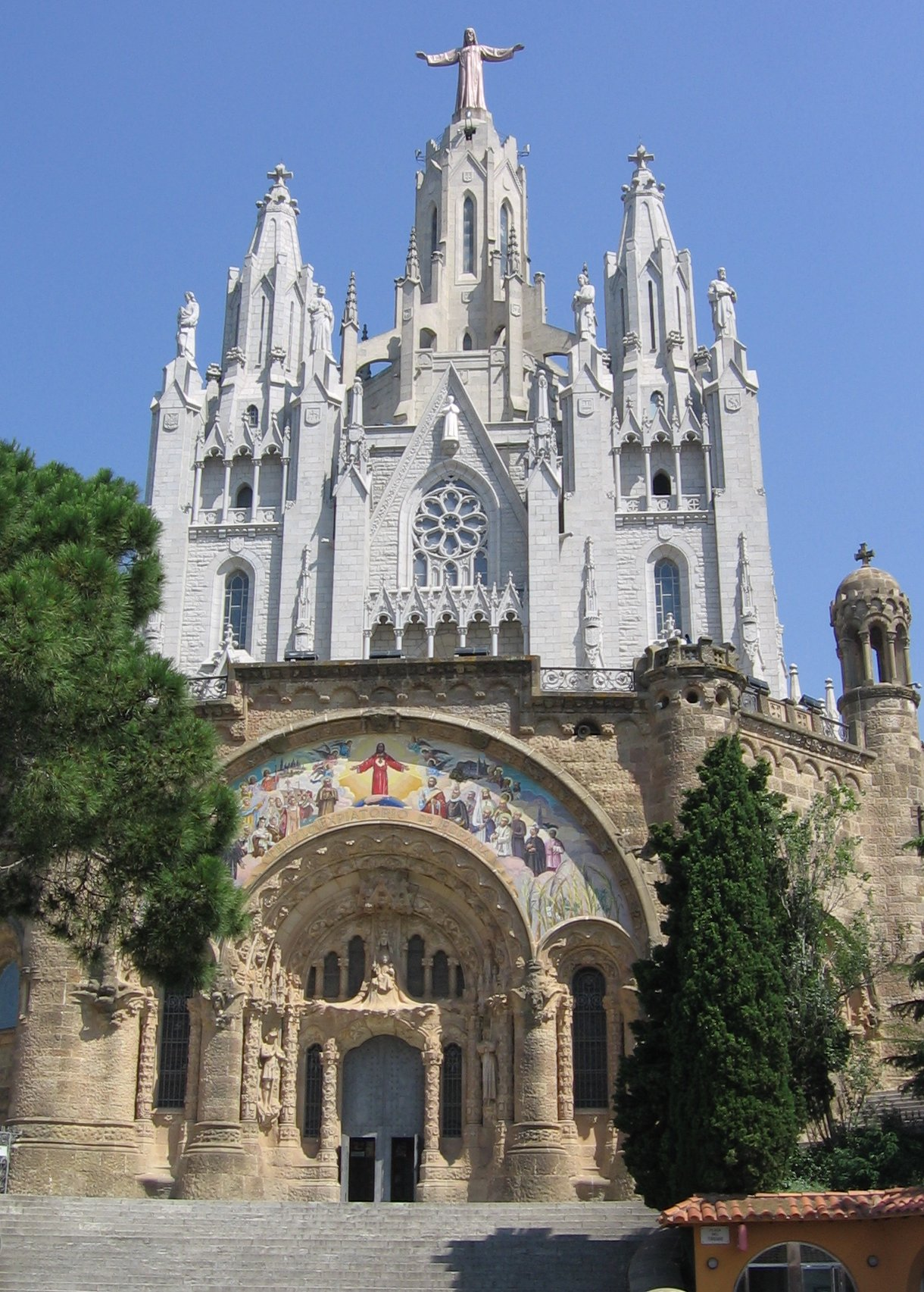
The church of Sagrat Cor atop the Tibidabo

Enric Sagnier i Villavecchia (Catalan pronunciation: [ənˈrik səŋniˈe]; 1858 in Barcelona – 1931) was a Catalan architect.

Although now not as well known as his contemporaries Antoni Gaudí, Lluís Domènech i Montaner and Josep Puig i Cadafalch, he was responsible for a number of landmark buildings, was very prolific, and could turn his hand to many styles, including neo-Gothic, neo-Baroque and Modernista. He qualified as an architect in 1882, and one of his earliest works, together with Josep Domènech i Estapà, was the Palau de Justícia in Barcelona.

Other well-known buildings by him in Barcelona are the Caixa de Pensions building in the Via Laietana, the New Customs House (Duana) and the church on the Tibidabo.

== Life and character ==
Enric Sagnier was born in Barcelona on 21 March 1858, the son of Lluís Sagnier i Nadal, president of the Caixa d’Estalvis i Mont de Pietat de Barcelona (a bank), and Clementina Villavecchia Busquets. His father was an outstanding Classics scholar, who translated Xenophon and Anacreon, and the young Enric was a talented painter and violinist. He studied at the Barcelona Higher School of Architecture, from which he graduated in 1882.

He began his professional career as an assistant to Francisco de Paula del Villar y Lozano: under his instructions he carried out his first work, the refurbishment of the chapel of Sant Josep in the church of Santa Maria de Montserrat abbey (1884). His first important work was the church of Santa Engràcia de Montcada (1886), in neo-Gothic style; it was destroyed during the Spanish Civil War. His first apartment building, the Casa Cuyàs, was built the same year.

He enjoyed considerable professional success from the beginning, receiving many commissions from the Church and the Catalan aristocracy. In 1886, while still in his twenties, he was commissioned, together with Josep Domènech i Estapà, to design Barcelona's new Law Courts. Construction of this enormous project began the following year, and that same year Sagnier married Dolors Vidal-Ribas i Torrents. The couple had six children, of whom two died young and one, Josep Maria, also became an architect.

Enric Sagnier was a calm man of devout Catholic faith, who devoted his whole life to his career, and received many honours, such as the Barcelona City Council's Gold Medal for having won a prize in the Council's architecture competition three years running (1917). He was a member of the Acadèmia de Belles Arts de Sant Jordi and the Cercle Artístic de Sant Lluc, a society of Catholic artists, for which he designed the emblem. He also became a member of the Museums Board and a member of the board of the Caixa d’Estalvis de Barcelona. He was occasionally involved in politics, serving as Provincial Deputy on two occasions, representing a Catholic group allied to the Lliga Regionalista, the Centre de Defensa Social. He maintained close links with the Church, particularly the Salesians; he was appointed Diocesan architect of Barcelona, and in 1923 the Pope created him a Marquis. In his later years he worked with his son Josep Maria Sagnier i Vidal. He died in Barcelona in 1931.

== Works ==
Three things are characteristic of Sagnier's work: he was very prolific; he was always ready to adopt new technologies; and he eschewed a rigidly personal style, preferring to adapt to changing tastes. His career can be divided into three periods: before 1900 his work was eclectic, monumental and grandiose; from 1900 to 1910 he turned to softer decorative forms in his architecture, adopting a Modernista style; and after 1910 he veered towards Neoclassicism, shunning the architectural trends of the moment.

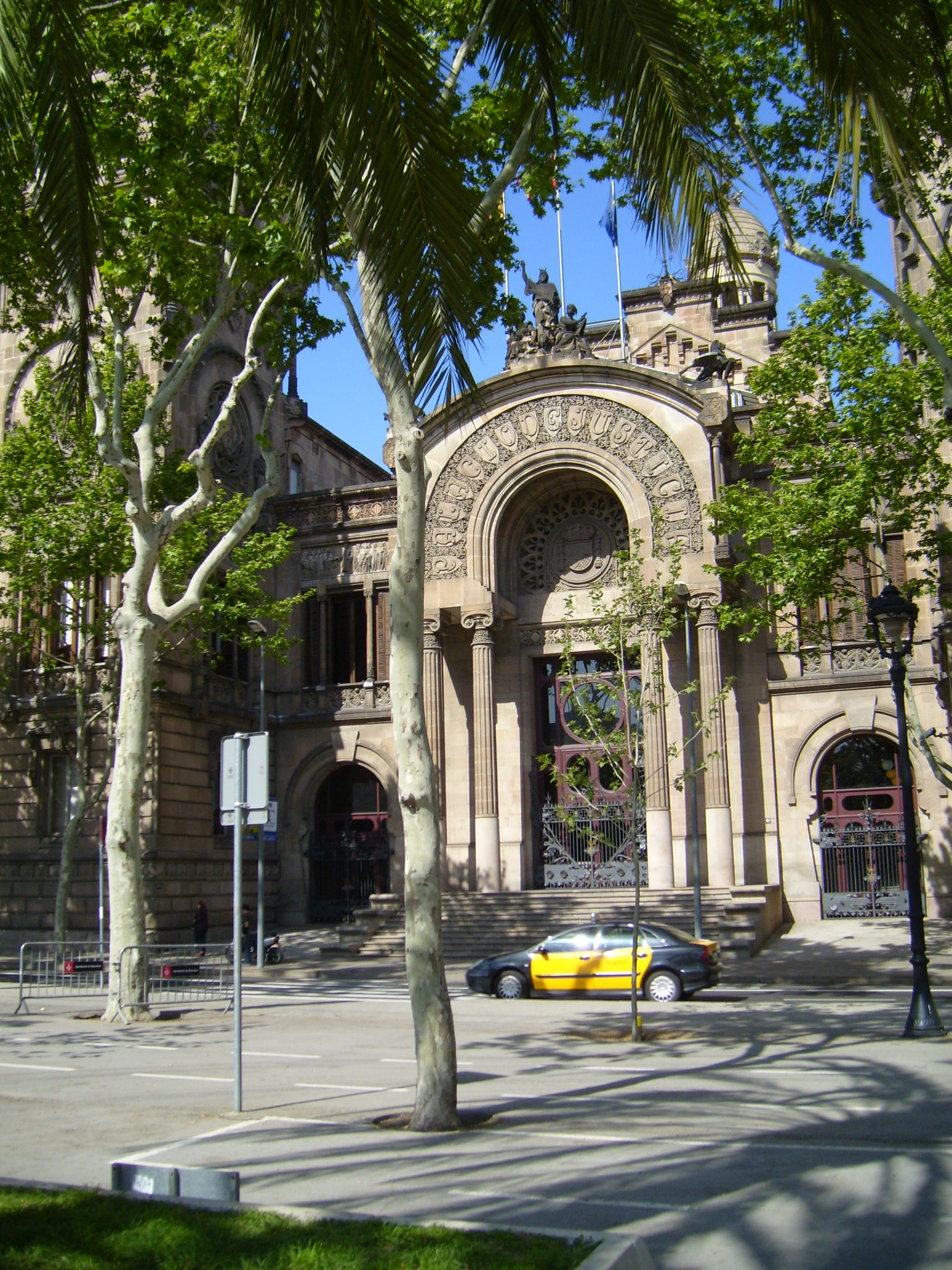
The Palau de Justícia (law courts), one of Sagnier's early works.

=== Early works ===
As well as the new church of Montcada i Reixac and the Casa Cuyàs already mentioned, Sagnier's early works included a project for the Exposición Universal de Barcelona (1888), which was never built; this was the Leo XIII pavilion, which was to have housed the representation of the Papal States.

During the last decade of the century, Sagnier devoted himself mainly to houses: Casa Juncadella, at Rambla Catalunya number 33 (1888–1891), notable for its ornamental sculpture and wrought iron; the Pons houses, at Passeig de Gràcia 2 and 4 (1890), in neo-Gothic style, flanked by two pointed towers; the Tomàs Roger house, at Ausiàs Marc 37-39 (1892–1894), combines Classical elements with sculptures alluding to the Plateresque style.

In the field of religious architecture, Sagnier received several commissions from the Salesians, such as the sanctuary of Santa Maria Auxiliadora (1889–1901), made up of a choir with room for 300 people and a three-aisled nave; for inspiration, Sagnier had turned to the mother house of the Salesians in Turin. Between 1892 and 1897 he designed the Jesús-Maria school, in Passeig de Sant Gervasi, neo-Gothic in style, and between 1892 and 1894, the college of the Sacred heart of Jesus, at the corner of Diputació and Bailén, over a prior construction by Josep Vilaseca. In the Clot district he built the Centro de Nuestra Señora del Carmen y San Pedro Claver (1899–1903), a complex housing schools and training workshops for young workers, which was destroyed in 1936.

In 1893 he built the Frontón Barcelonés, at Carrer Diputació 415, the first facility in Barcelona for playing Basque pelota; it was open to the sky, and the spectators sat in a three-storey iron structure, decorated with stuccos; this building disappeared in 1902. Between 1896 and 1902, with Pere Garcia Fària, he built the New Customs House in the port of Barcelona, a typical example of his eclectic style.

=== Modernista period ===
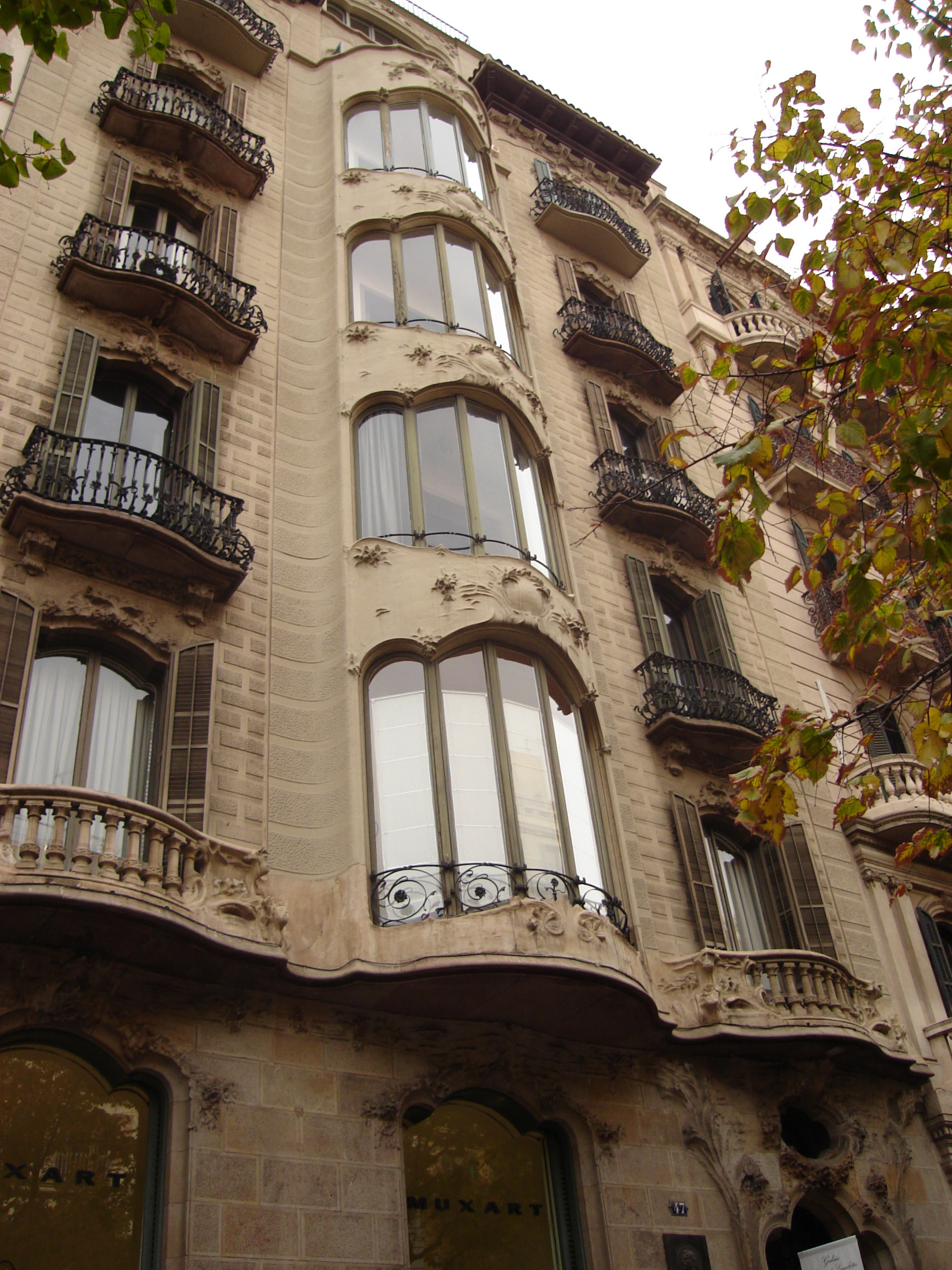
Casa Fargas, Rambla de Catalunya, 47, Barcelona (1902-4)

At the turn of the 20th century, Sagnier drew closer to the Modernista forms that were then becoming the fashion, particularly in the use of the applied arts, the proliferation of sculpture and ironwork; however, the use of decorative stained glass, wall tiles and scratchwork, so characteristic of Modernisme, are much less evident in Sagnier's work of this period.

One of the first of his works that could be described as Modernista was the Garriga house, at Diputació 250 (1899–1901), with its elegant use of sculpture, landscapes in stained glass by A. Rigalt and the brackets that support the main balcony by Eusebi Arnau. The Juncadella house, at Rambla Catalunya 26 (1900–1901), includes many innovations by Sagnier such as trefoil openings, Baroque finials and the concentration of decoration in horizontal bands. The Carulla house, in Mallorca 214 (1900), was notable for its facade crowned by an allegory of painting, in Rococo style. In this period Sagnier also worked in the field of funerary architecture for the Catalan aristocracy, such as the hypogeum of the Olivella family (1909) or the Juncadella family tomb (1910), with its twin volumes flanking an obelisk.

In 1903 Sagnier became architect to the Benedictine abbey of Montserrat, taking over from his former mentor Villar y Lozano. He was responsible for a number of works there, all of which have now disappeared: the chapel of the Most Holy Sacrament; a sumptuous marble altar with gilded metalwork; the Second Mystery of the Rosary, with a sculptural group by Agapit Vallmitjana i Abarca; and the sculptural group of the Stations of the Cross (1904–16), on the hillside of Montserrat, with sculptures by Eusebi Arnau, made up of fourteen Stations in a vaguely Gaudiesque style: roughly hewn surfaces, naturalistic pinnacles, etc. It was perhaps because of this link with the Benedictine order that he received a commission to design a school in Perth (Australia), where there was a mission, New Norcia, under the aegis of a Catalan abbot, Fulgenci Torres Mayans; there he was responsible for the church and Saint Gertrude school (1904–1906), in neo-Gothic style.

Also from this period, although not at all Modernista in style, is what is undoubtedly Sagnier's most important religious work, the Templo Expiatorio del Sagrado Corazón, on the Tibidabo in Barcelona, work on which began in 1902 and went on until 1961, continued after Enric Sagnier's death by his son Josep Maria. This work was fruit of the patronage of Dorotea de Chopitea, who along with other promoters donated land to Saint John Bosco during his visit to Barcelona in 1886, for the construction of a church dedicated to the Sacred Heart of Jesus, after the one built in Rome by Bosco himself (Sacro Cuore di Gesù), as well as the famous Sacré-Cœur in Paris. The foundation stone was laid on 28 December 1902 in a ceremony led by the bishop of Barcelona, Salvador Casañas i Pagès.

The basilica is made up of a crypt below and the upper church, with a central dome supported on eight columns. The crypt, with a Byzantine air, was built between 1902 and 1911, and the upper church between 1915 and 1951, although the exterior was not finished until 1961. The neo-Romanesque style of the crypt culminates in the Gothic verticals of the upper church, topped by the image of the Sacred Heart. The original statue was by Frederic Marès, but this was destroyed in 1936 and replaced with the existing one by Josep Miret in 1950. The exterior of the church is more stylistically contained than is the case of the flamboyant Gothic of Sagnier's early projects.

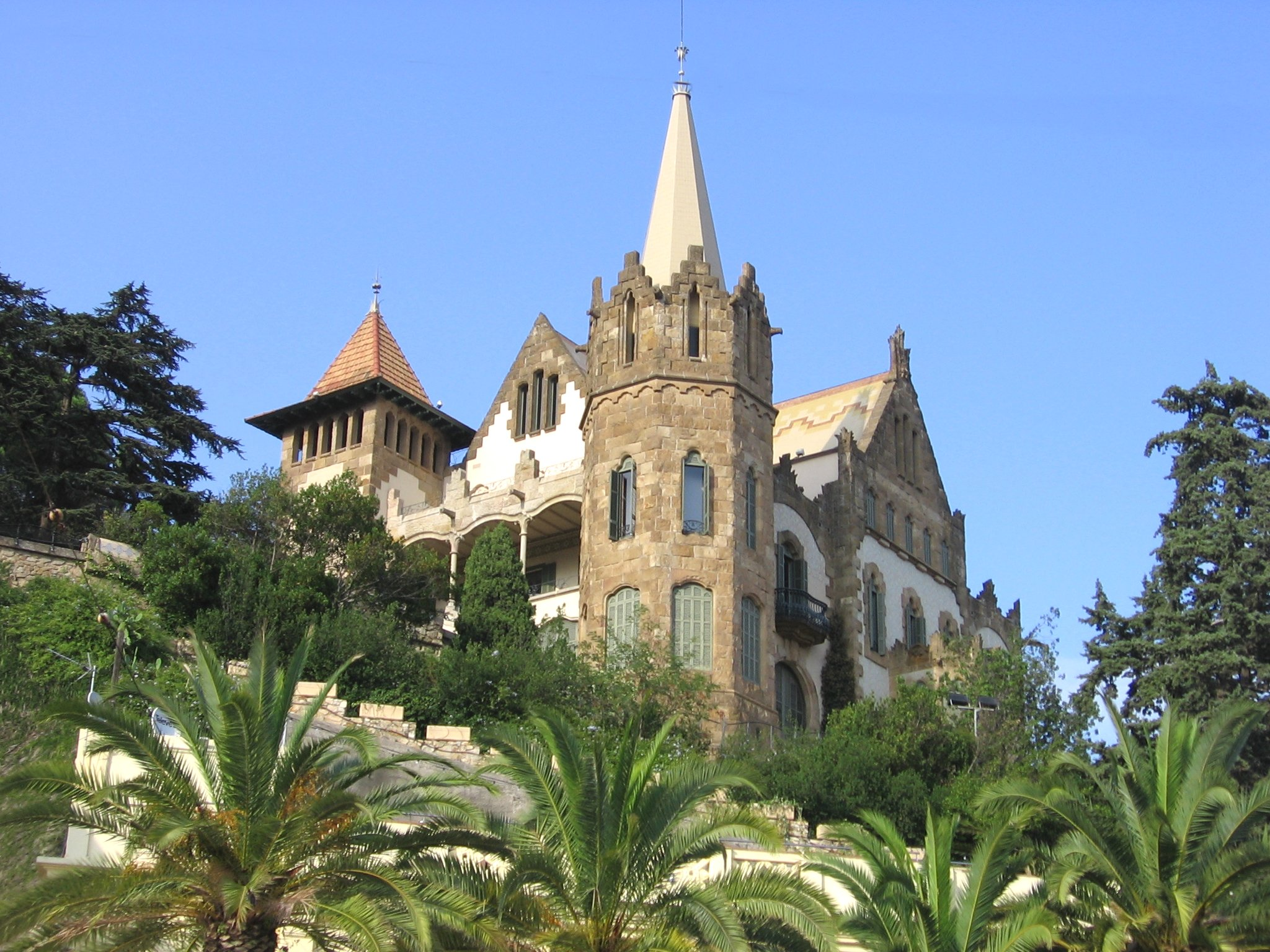
El Pinar, the house built for the banker Manuel Arnús

Another of Sagnier's works on the Tibidabo from this period is the mansion for the banker Manuel Arnús (1902), which occupies a highly prominent site on a spur of the hillside and is visible from many parts of the city. Sagnier used Montjuïc stone as well as scratchwork and tiles; the carved stone decoration is naturalist in style, similar to that used in the nearby church of the Sagrat Cor. The towers and trefoil openings give it a mediaeval air, while the gallery is reminiscent of the traditional Catalan farmhouse, the masia.

Other works from this period are the Mulleras house, at Gran Via 654 (1903–1905), in neo-Rococo style, and "La Pompeia", a church and monastery for the Capuchin order (1907–1915) at Diagonal, 450, so called because it is dedicated to Our Lady of the Rosary of Pompeii. It draws inspiration from Catalan Gothic architecture in features such as the roof of the church, made up of beams supported on diaphragm arches, similar to those of the Santa Àgata chapel in the mediaeval royal palace in the Gothic Quarter, and the style of the tower in the west end, reminiscent of those of Santa Maria del Mar.

=== Mature period ===
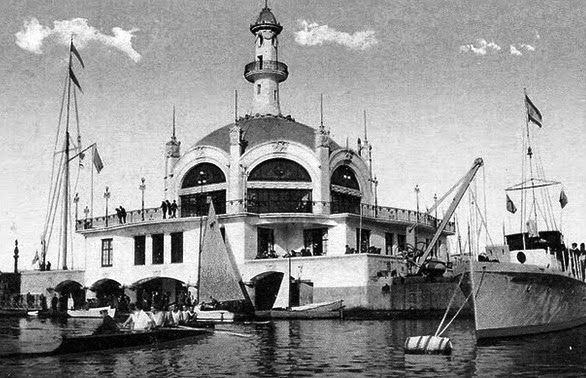
Real Club Marítimo

In the following years, Sagnier entered a period of less intense professional activity, and received ample official recognition. He gradually abandoned Modernisme, adopting a personal, eclectic Classical style. In 1911 he won the competition to design the Real Club Marítimo in Barcelona (built between 1911 and 1913), an octagonal building roofed by a dome and topped by a sort of lighthouse; it was demolished in 1957. In 1912 he began to build the French Chapel in Carrer Bruc, with a crypt divided into three aisles and an upper church in neo-Romanesque style, finished in 1927 probably by his son Josep Maria. Also in 1912 he built the palatial residence of the marquis of Alella, on the corner of the streets of Muntaner and Marià Cubí, a group of buildings in a style influenced by Plateresque, with paintings by Josep Maria Sert.

Between 1916 and 1936 Sagnier designed a complex of buildings for the Provincial Board for the Protection of Children and Suppression of Begging, which were completed by Josep Maria Sagnier. These occupied a whole city block in the Bogatell district, an ambitious facility divided into pavilions with a frontage on several streets, with courtyards in the centre. Most of the complex was demolished in 1970, leaving only the pavilion currently used to house the Wad-Ras prison.

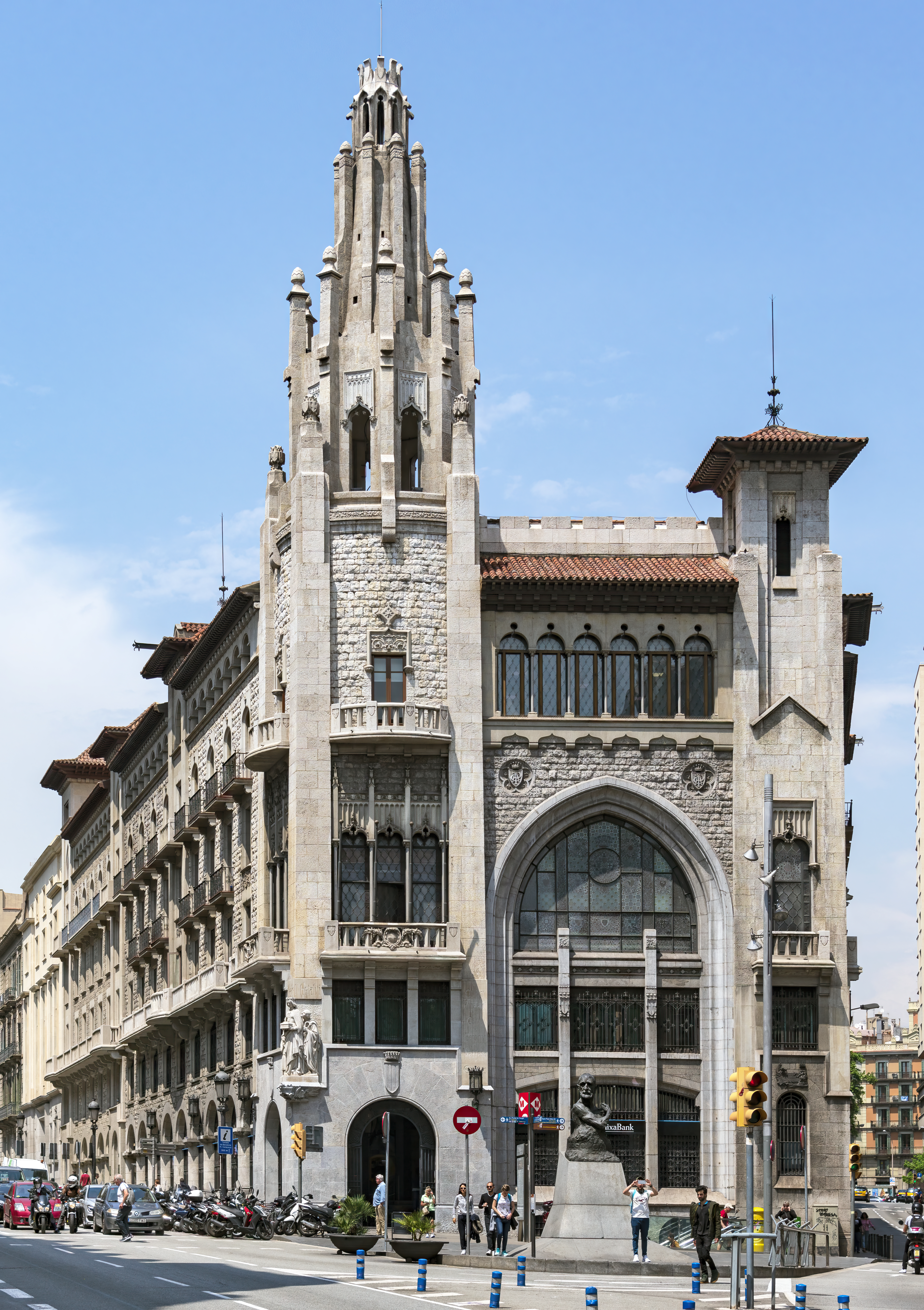
The Caixa de Pensions building in the Via Laietana, Barcelona, built in 1917.

Perhaps Sagnier's most important work from this period is the headquarters building for the Caixa de Pensions de Barcelona savings bank, in Via Laietana (1914–1917). As originally conceived there were to be offices on the ground floor and apartments for rent on the upper floors, in order to generate income from the investment. The main facade, dominated by the tower and giving onto the corner of Via Laietana and what was then the Plaça de Bilbao, has the principal entrance doors on the ground floor, and above them the grand windows of the boardroom and the senior management offices, while entry to the rental apartments was from the frontages on the side-streets. The structure of the building employs reinforced concrete—a pioneering material at the time—with an external stone cladding. The original banking hall was richly decorated with paintings and marbles and was lit from above by a skylight.

The Caixa soon outgrew these premises, and in 1920 they commissioned Sagnier to build an annex around the corner in Carrer Jonqueres. He was also responsible for several branch offices for the Caixa, in Igualada (1922), Sabadell (1923), Manresa (1924) and Tarragona (1929).

During the First World War, boom years in Spain as a result of its neutrality, Sagnier received many commissions: between 1915 and 1926 he executed the basilica of Sant Josep Oriol, in Carrer Diputació. Stylistically, this church breaks with the contemporary fashion for Mediaevalism—neo-Gothic and neo-Romanesque—adopting instead the form of a Roman basilica with aisles separated by arcades, a pattern subsequently often used in the post-Civil War period. In 1915 he designed a project to lay out the Miramar area of Montjuïc, but in the end it was not used. In this time he also received two commissions for buildings in the Plaça de Catalunya: the reconstruction of the Hotel Colón (1916), which no longer exists, but in which he replaced the earlier Modernista building with one of Classical style; and the Banca Arnús building (1918–1927), now the Banco Central Hispanoamericano, also in a Classical style.

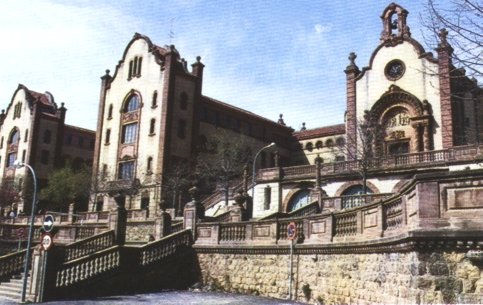
Patronato Ribas

From about 1920, Sagnier worked less: notable amongst his late works is the Patronato Ribas, an orphanage in Vall d’Hebron 93-103 (1920–1930); it is an ingeniously structured complex of buildings, arranged symmetrically round the axis of the chapel in H-shaped blocks; the decoration harks back to Baroque populism, notably the terracota reliefs inspired in Catalan tradition. The buildings now house a secondary school (IES Vall d’Hebron).

Sagnier was a member of the jury to decide on projects for the 1929 Barcelona International Exposition on Montjuïc, amongst others, the competition for the design of the Central Palace of the Expo—now Palau Nacional and home to the Museu Nacional d'Art de Catalunya. As part of the run-up to the Expo, Sagnier was commissioned to restore the Archbishop's Palace in Barcelona; the work consisted of modifying the interior courtyard, revealing an original Gothic window and Romanesque arcades, and constructing a new staircase. As diocesan architect, he was also asked, in conjunction with Bonaventura Bassegoda, to move the choir stalls of Barcelona cathedral, but this project was never carried out. Being a member of the Provincial Council he also designed the Spanish Provinces pavilion for the 1929 Expo, in Plateresque Gothic style, with an equestrian statue of Saint George by Josep Llimona. Also, at the Ibero-American Exposition of 1929 in Seville he built the pavilion for the Catalan provinces, a building in the shape of the traditional Catalan farmhouse, the masia.

=== List of principal works ===
==== Barcelona ====
Year	Name	Location	Description	Condition
1887–1911	Palau de Justícia de Barcelona	Passeig Lluís Companys	Building to house Barcelona's law courts, in collaboration with Josep Domènech i Estapà.	Good
1888–1890	Casa Antoni Roger Vidal	C/ Ausiàs Marc, 33-35/Girona, 20	House for Antoni Roger Vidal, in an eclectic style. In front of it, the facade of the Casa Burés, by Francesc Berenguer i Mestres, was adapted to respect the aesthetics of this building.	Good
1888–1891	Casa Rodolf Juncadella	Rambla Catalunya, 33	House for Rodolf Juncadella. A notable feature is the carving and wrought-ironwork by Pere Carbonell.	Good
1890–1891	Cases Pons	Passeig de Gràcia, 2 i 4	Houses for Alexandre Pons Serra and Isidra Pons de Pascual, neo-Gothic in style, with decoration by Alexandre de Riquer.	Good
1892–1897	Jesús-Maria school	Passeig de Sant Gervasi, 15	Commissioned by the Salesian order, neo-Gothic in style.	Good
1893	Frontó Barceloní	C/ Diputació, 415	Facility for playing Basque pelota.	No longer exists
1896–1902	Customs house in the Port de Barcelona	Passeig Josep Carner, 29	New customs house, built in collaboration with Pere Garcia i Fària.	Good
1899–1901	Casa Garriga Nogués	C/ Diputació, 250	House for Rupert Garriga, with stained-glass windows by Antoni Rigalt and carvings by Eusebi Arnau. Since 2008 it has housed the Museu Fundació Francisco Gòdia and from 2015 Fundación Mapfre Casa Garriga Nogués.	Excellent
1902–1904	House for Manuel Arnús, known as "El Pinar" and "Casa Arnús"	Plaça del Doctor Andreu (Tibidabo)	House for Manuel Arnús, neo-Gothic in style, with allusions to Catalan rural architecture.	Good
1902–1961	Temple Expiatori del Sagrat Cor	Tibidabo	Church promoted by Dorotea de Chopitea, who along with others, donated the land to Don John Bosco during his visit to Barcelona in 1886, with the intention of raising a church dedicated to the Sacred Heart of Jesus.	Good
1904	Triumphal arch in honour of Alfonso XIII	Passeig de Gràcia	Triumphal arch to mark the visit of Alfonso XIII to Barcelona, on 6 April de 1904, commissioned by Claudi López i Bru|, marquis of Comillas.	No longer exists
1905	Quinta Regina	C/ Plantada 1-5	House in its own grounds in the Sant Gervasi district, historicist in style, with Nordic influence, commissioned by Francesc Vidal Solares.	Fair
1907–1915	"Pompeia" church and convent	Av. Diagonal, 450	Church and convent for the Capuchins, inspired by Catalan Gothic architecture.	Good
1910–1911	Casa Ramon Mulleras	Passeig de Gràcia, 37	House forming part of the so-called Illa de la Discòrdia, or "Block of disharmony", because it contains several contrasting buildings by famous modernista architects: the Casa Lleó Morera by Lluís Domènech i Montaner, the Casa Amatller by Josep Puig i Cadafalch and the Casa Batlló by Antoni Gaudí.	Good
1911	Casa Doctor Genové	la Rambla, 77	Building on a narrow plot to accommodate the owner's pharmacy and laboratory. Notable features are the central opening with a Tudor arch to give more light to the main room, and the carving of Esculapius at the entrance. The mosaics are by Lluís Brú i Salelles.	Good
1911–1913	Reial Club Marítim de Barcelona	Port of Barcelona	Octagonal building roofed with a dome and topped by a sort of lighthouse.	Demolished in 1957
1910/1914	Enric Cera House	Carrer Or, 38-40 Gracia	In historicist style this house is named after Enric Cera (Casa Enric Cera) This mansion especially stands out for its two square towers topped by slate pinnacles.	Excellent
1914–1917	Head office for the Caixa de Pensions de Barcelona	Via Laietana, 56-58	Originally conceived to be used for offices on the ground floor and apartments for rent on the upper floors, in order to generate income from the investment.	Good
1915–1916	Casa Salvador Andreu	Av. Tibidabo, 21	Noucentista building conceived as a summer residence within the residential estate promoted by Doctor Andreu.	Excellent
1915–1926	Basílica de Sant Josep Oriol	C/ Diputació, 141	Commissioned by Magdalena Modolell, in the expectation of the imminent canonization of the Blessed Josep Oriol.	Good
1916	Hotel Colón	Plaça de Catalunya	Replaced an earlier modernista building with one in a Classical style.	No longer exists
1916–1936	Junta Provincial de Protecció a la Infància i Repressió de la Mendicitat	Bogatell	Complex of buildings for a charitable institution.	Mostly demolished in 1970, leaving only the pavilion housing the Wad-Ras women's prison.
1918	Casa de J. Pujol	Psg. Bonanova, 64	Modernista detached house, one of the few examples remaining in this street of buildings from this period.	Good
1918–1927	Banca Arnús	Plaça de Catalunya	A building in Classical style that now houses the Banco Central Hispanoamericano.	Good
1920–1930	Patronat Ribas	Passeig de la Vall d'Hebron, 93-103	Orphanage built with a bequest by Lluís Ribas i Regordosa, now a secondary school.	Good
1929	Palau de les Diputacions	Av. Marquès de Comillas/Montanyans	Pavilion for the Provincial authorities at the 1929 International Exposition on Montjuïc.	No longer exists

==== Castelldefels ====
Year	Name	Location	Description	Condition
1903–1909	Parish church of Santa Maria	Plaça de l'Església	Built to substitute the original Romanesque church.	Good
1897	Castelldefels Castle	Castillo de Castelldefels	Restoration of castle ruins	

==== Monistrol de Montserrat ====
Year	Name	Location	Description	Condition
1904–1916	Via Crucis de Montserrat	Montserrat	Series of 14 sculptural groups on the Passion of Christ, with carving by Eusebi Arnau.	Destroyed in 1936

==== Montcada i Reixac ====
Year	Name	Location	Description	Condition
1888–1928	Church of Santa Engràcia	C/ Major	Neo-Gothic church.	Destroyed in 1936

==== Perth (Australia) ====
Year	Name	Location	Description	Condition
1904–1906	Church and school of Santa Gertrudis	Perth	Church and school for the Benedictine mission of New Norcia, led by a Catalan abbot, Fulgenci Torres i Mayans.	Good

==== Sabadell ====
Year	Name	Location	Description	Condition
1910–1921	Parish church of Sant Feliu	Plaça de Sant Roc	Church to replace the one destroyed in 1909 during the Semana Trágica.	Good

==== Sant Pere de Ribes ====
Year	Name	Location	Description	Condition
1918	Finca Mas Solers	Carretera BV, 2112	Former farmhouse converted into a mansion.	Good

==== San Sebastián ====
Year	Name	Location	Description	Condition
1905	Torres de Arbide	Parque Miramón	Towers in a neo-Gothic style echoing the mediaeval castle.	Good

==== Seville ====
Year	Name	Location	Description	Condition
1929	Pavilion of the Catalan provinces	Parque María Luisa	Pavilion of the Catalan provinces at the Ibero-American Exposition in Seville in 1929.	No longer exists

==== Sitges ====
Year	Name	Location	Description	Condition
1899	Casa Isabel Ferret	C/Ribera, 29	Detached house for Isabel Ferret.	Good

==== Valencia ====
Year	Name	Location	Description	Condition
1903–1905	Houses in Carrer de la Pau	C/ de la Pau, 21-23 GSV	Houses in collaboration with Francesc Mora Berenguer.	Good
1928	Caja de Previsión Social	Av. Marquès de Sotelo, 8	Imposing monumental building, in collaboration with Enrique Viedma.	Good

==== Vic ====
Year	Name	Location	Description	Condition
1896	Fàbrica Torra	C/Bisbe Morgades, 15	Sausage factory.	Good
1896	Farinera Costa, la Catalana	C/Bisbe Morgades, 9	Flour Mill.	Excellent

== References and bibliography ==
Adapted from Spanish Wikipedia

- Various authors: Modernisme i Modernistes, Lunwerg, Barcelona, 2001. ISBN 84-7782-776-1
- Barjau, Santi: Enric Sagnier, Labor, Barcelona, 1992. ISBN 84-335-4802-6
- Barral i Altet, Xavier: Art de Catalunya. Arquitectura religiosa moderna i contemporània, L’isard, Barcelona, 1999. ISBN 84-89931-14-3
- Fontbona, Francesc y Miralles, Francesc: Història de l’Art Català. Del modernisme al noucentisme (1888–1917), Ed. 62, Barcelona, 1985. ISBN 84-297-2282-3
- Lacuesta, Raquel: Modernisme a l’entorn de Barcelona, Diputació de Barcelona, Barcelona, 2006. ISBN 84-9803-158-3
- Navascués Palacio, Pedro: Summa Artis. Arquitectura española (1808–1914), Espasa-Calpe, Madrid, 2000. ISBN 84-239-5477-3
- Permanyer, Lluís: Barcelona modernista, Ed. Polígrafa, Barcelona, 1993. ISBN 84-343-0723-5
- Various authors: Sagnier. Arquitecte, Barcelona 1858-1931, Antonio Sagnier Bassas, Barcelona, 2007. ISBN 978-84-612-0215-7
- Barjau, Santi: Ruta Sagnier: Arquitecto. Barcelona 1858-1931, Institut Municipal del Paisatge Urbá i La Qualitat de Vida, Ayuntamiento de Barcelona, 2009. ISBN 978-84-96696-13-6
- Höfer, Candida: Sagnier Architect by Candida Höfer, Antonio Sagnier Bassas, Barcelona, 2012. ISBN 978-84-615-8169-6
