= Domenech =

Domènech (Eastern Catalan: [duˈmɛnək]) is a common Catalan surname. Its variants are Domènec, Domenech and Doménech. It can also be found sometimes as a given name.

== People ==
=== As surname ===
- Adrián Domenech, Argentine football player and former coach of Argentinos Juniors
- Agustina Saragossa Domènech, or Agustina of Aragón, heroine who defended the city of Zaragoza during the Spanish War of Independence
- Albert Crusat Domènech, Catalan football player who spent most of his professional career with UD Almería
- Amédée Domenech, French rugby union player mostly for CA Brive and former player of the French national team, later a politician for the Radical Party
- Ben Domenech, American conservative writer and blogger
- Camilo Rey Domenech, Argentine footballer
- Dolors Martí Domènech (1901–1970), the only woman in Tarragona, Spain, to have a public career and to hold a position of political responsibility with the Catalan Republican government
- Douglas Domenech, Deputy Chief of Staff of the United States Department of the Interior
- Emmanuel-Henri-Dieudonné Domenech, French abbé, missionary and author
- Ernest Urtasun Domènech, Catalan politician for Initiative for Catalonia Greens, diplomat and economist
- Francisco Domenech, Director of the Office of Legislative Services of Puerto Rico
- Jaime Domènech, Spanish footballer who played as a forward for RCD Espanyol and Valencia CF
- Jaume Domènech Sánchez, Spanish professional footballer for Valencia CF
- Josep Caballé Domènech, Catalan musician and conductor
- Josep Domènech i Estapà, Catalan architect
- Josep Juan i Domènech, Catalan anarcho-syndicalist politician
- Lluís Domènech i Montaner, Catalan architect, politician and Catalan nationalist
- Manuel Guijarro Doménech, Spanish racing cyclist
- Manuel Ascunce Domenech, Cuban educator
- Manuel V. Domenech, Puerto Rican politician
- Maria Domènech i Escoté, Catalan writer
- Raymond Domenech, French football player and manager of the French national team
- Salvador Dalí i Domènech, Catalan surrealist painter, best known for his painting of melting clocks and probably the best known surrealist artist
- Sergio Doménech, Spanish judoka
- Xavier Domenech i Sampere, Catalan historian, activist and politician, spokesperson for En Comú Podem electoral coalition

=== As given name ===
- Domènec Balmanya i Perera, also referred to as Domingo Balmaña, Catalan footballer and manager who spent most of his playing career at FC Barcelona
- Domènec Batet i Mestres, Catalan military man
- Domènec Fita i Molat, Catalan sculptor
- Domènec Sugrañes i Gras, Catalan modernist architect and disciple of Antoni Gaudí
- Domènech Terradellas, Spanish opera composer

== See also ==
- Domene (surname)
