= Francisco Domene =

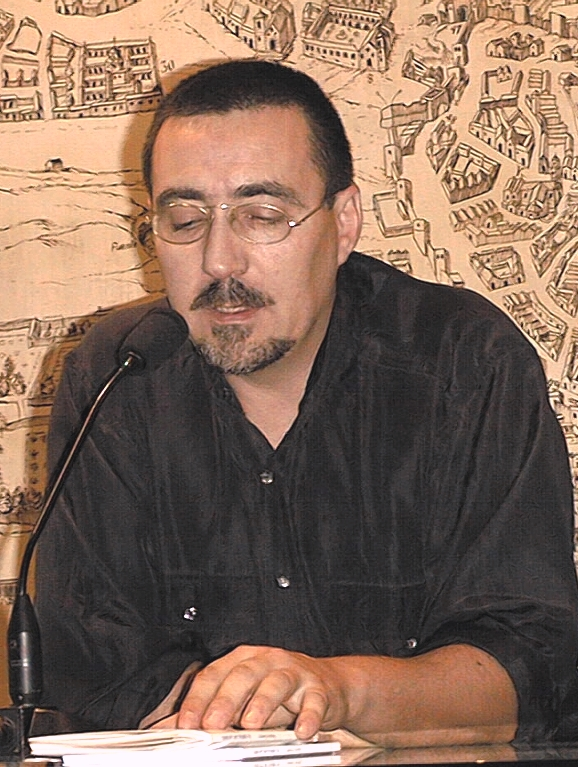
- Reading at the Casa de los Tiros. Granada. Spain, 2001
- Born: 12 February 1960 (age 66); Caniles, (Granada)
- Occupations: poet, author, writer, narrator, novelist and teacher.

Francisco Domene (born 12 February 1960) is a Spanish writer, narrator, novelist, and poet. He was born in Caniles, Granada, Spain.

== Bibliography ==
Francisco Domene is probably one of the most personal poets of contemporary Spanish literature. He has written poetry, essays, short stories and novels, some of them placed in the genre of literature for young people, science fiction and adventures novels.

== Works ==
Poetry

- Sobrevivir. Ed. AUTOR-EDITOR 17. 1986. ISBN 84-398-6253-9
- Libro de las horas. Col. Genil. Diputación de Granada. 1991. ISBN 84-7807-036-2
- Propósito de enmienda. Kutxa. San Sebastián. 1992. ISBN 84-7173-195-9
- Insistencia en las Horas. Ediciones Libertarias. Madrid. 1993. ISBN 84-7683-199-4
- Falso Testimonio. (Plaquette) Plataforma por la Cultura Región Murcia / Colectivo Octubre. 1998. ISBN 84-922294-4-6
- Falso Testimonio. Col. Julio Nombela. Asociación de Escritores y Artistas Españoles. Madrid. 1.999. ISBN 84-87857-21-3
- Arrabalías. Oikos-Tau. Barcelona. 2000. ISBN 84-281-0983-4
- El cristal de las doce. DVD Ediciones. Barcelona. 2001. ISBN 84-95007-42-8

Narrative

- La última aventura.(The latest adventure).(Novel) Ed. Anaya, Madrid. 1992. ISBN 84-207-4818-8
- El detector de inocentes.(The detector of innocents).(story), Ed. Instituto de Estudios Almerienses Almería. 1.999. ISBN 84-8108-189-2
- Ana y el misterio de la Tierra de Mu. (Anna and the mystery of the Land of Mu) (Novel) Ed. Anaya. Madrid, 1.999. ISBN 84-207-9239-X
- El asunto Poseidón.(The Poseidon case).(novel) Ed. Anaya. Madrid. 2001. ISBN 84-667-0609-7
- Cuentos y leyendas de los dioses griegos.(Stories and legends of the Greek Gods). Editorial Anaya. Madrid. 2010. ISBN 978-84-667-9319-3
- Arañas en la barriga. (Spiders in the belly.)(Novel) Editorial VICEVERSA. Barcelona. 2011. ISBN 978-84-92819-63-8
- Ninfas, faunos, unicornios y otros mitos clásicos. (Nymphs, fauns, unicorns and other classical myths) (Novel/story.) Editorial Anaya. Madrid. 2012. ISBN 978-84-667-9319-3
- Relatos de la Biblia. (Bible stories) Editorial Anaya. Madrid. 2015. ISBN 978-84-678-7159-3

ISBN 9788467829112

Test, study

- Poesía Actual Almeriense. Ríomardesierto/city council of Almería, 1.992. ISBN 84-604-4722-7
- Narrativa Actual Almeriense. Ríomardesierto/city council of Almería, 1.992. ISBN 84-604-4721-9

== Awards and distinctions ==
- 1992: City Irún, for Propósito de enmienda (Purpose for amendment).
- 1995: Antonio Machado, for Paisaje (Landscape).
- 1998: Arts and Letters from the Diputación de Almería, for El detector de inocentes story (The detector innocent).
- 1998: Antonio Oliver Belmas and Award Blas de Otero, for Falso Testimonio (Perjury).
- 1999: Memorial Laureà Mela, for Arrabalías (Neighborhoods).
- 2000: Ciudad de Burgos, for El cristal de las doce (The twelve glass).
- 2016: Finalist of the Andalusia Awardof the Criticism
- 2016: José Hierro National Poetry Award, for Adjustment of accounts.
