= Fundación Mapfre Casa Garriga Nogués =

- Location: 250 Carrer de la Diputació, 08007 Barcelona, Spain
- Architect: Enric Sagnier
- Website: www.fundacionmapfre.org/fundacion/en/exhibitions/casa-garriga-nogues/

Fundación Mapfre Casa Garriga Nogués (full name Fundación Mapfre Casa Garriga Nogués Exhibition Hall) is an art gallery in the Eixample district of Barcelona, Spain. It was established in 2015 and shows early pictorial modern painting and photography (1850–1950) and other photography.

It is run by Fundación Mapfre in Casa Garriga Nogués, a Modernisme architecture building located between Rambla de Catalunya and Carrer de Balmes.

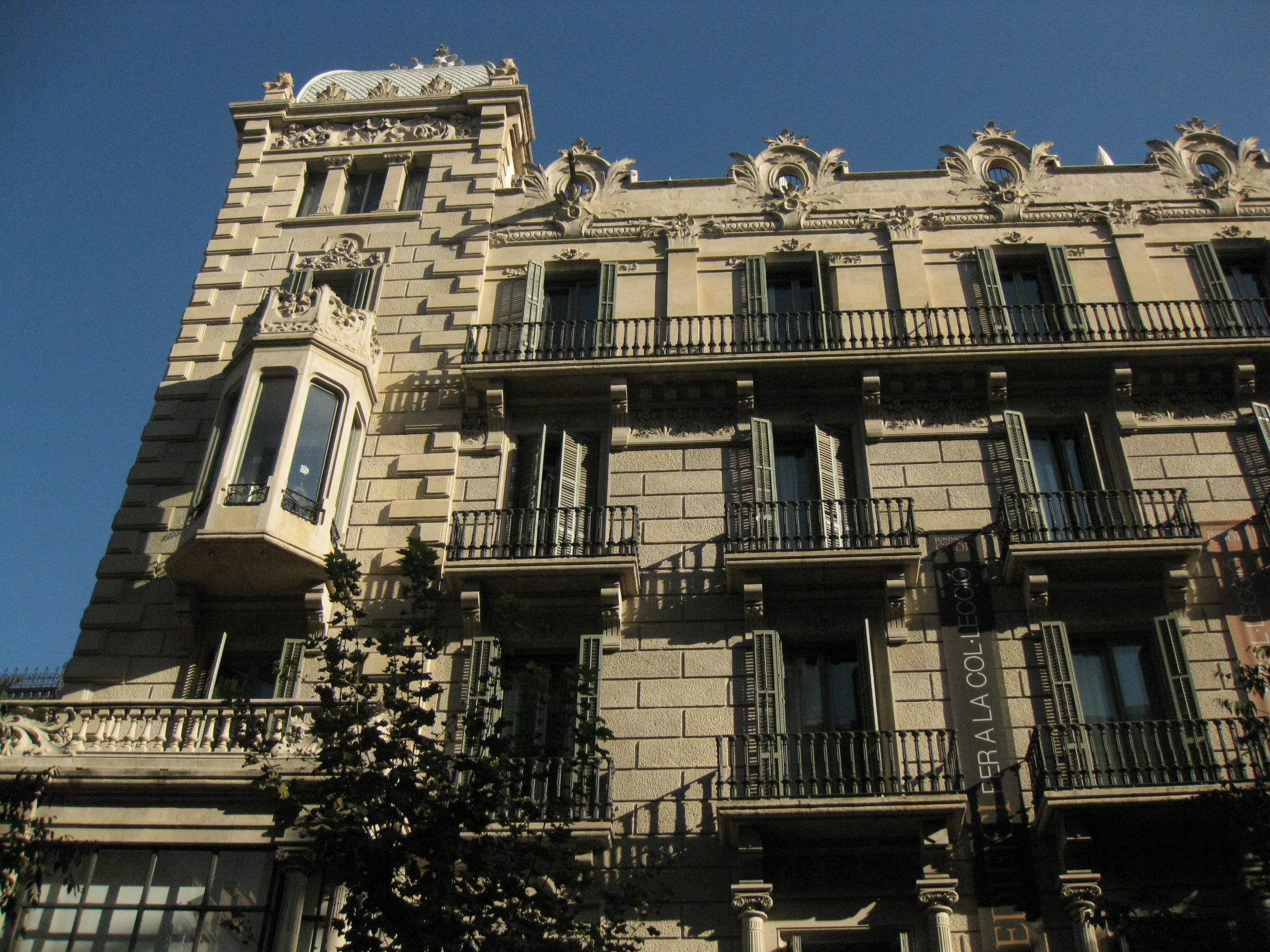
Casa Garriga Nogués

== The gallery ==
Fundación Mapfre opened the gallery in autumn 2015. It shows early pictorial modern painting and photography (1850–1950) as well as other photography. The exhibition space covers an area of over 2700 m2. Exhibitions are shown on the ground floor and in small rooms upstairs. Fundación Mapfre has conserved the original state of the rooms.

Fundación Mapfre is the charitable cultural arm of Spanish insurance company Mapfre.

The gallery opened with the exhibition The Triumph of Color. From Van Gogh to Matisse, Collections of the Musée d'Orsay. Subsequent exhibitions have included work by Bruce Davidson (2016), Pierre-Auguste Renoir (2016), Duane Michals (2017), Auguste Rodin (2017/2018), Brassaï (2018) and Shomei Tohmatsu (2018).

== The building – Casa Garriga Nogués ==
The Modernisme architecture residential property, Casa Garriga Nogués, was originally built for the banker Rupert Garriga Miranda and his family between 1899 and 1901. The architect was Enric Sagnier. Its facade has a protruding balcony on the main floor supported by four female figures sculpted by Eusebi Arnau, representing the four stages of life. The family lived on the first floor until the Spanish Civil War broke out in 1936.

After the Civil War, the building was used by a religious school, Sagrados Corazones de Jesús y de Maria (Sacred Hearts of Jesus and Mary). From 1986, it was the headquarters of the publishing house Fundació Enciclopèdia Catalana (Catalan Encyclopaedia Foundation), which carried out some refurbishment work. In 2008, it was used by the Francisco Godia Foundation, which adapted it into a modern exhibition and cultural space for its museum.

The exhibition space includes architectural styles ranging from Rococo to Neoclassicism to Modernisme.

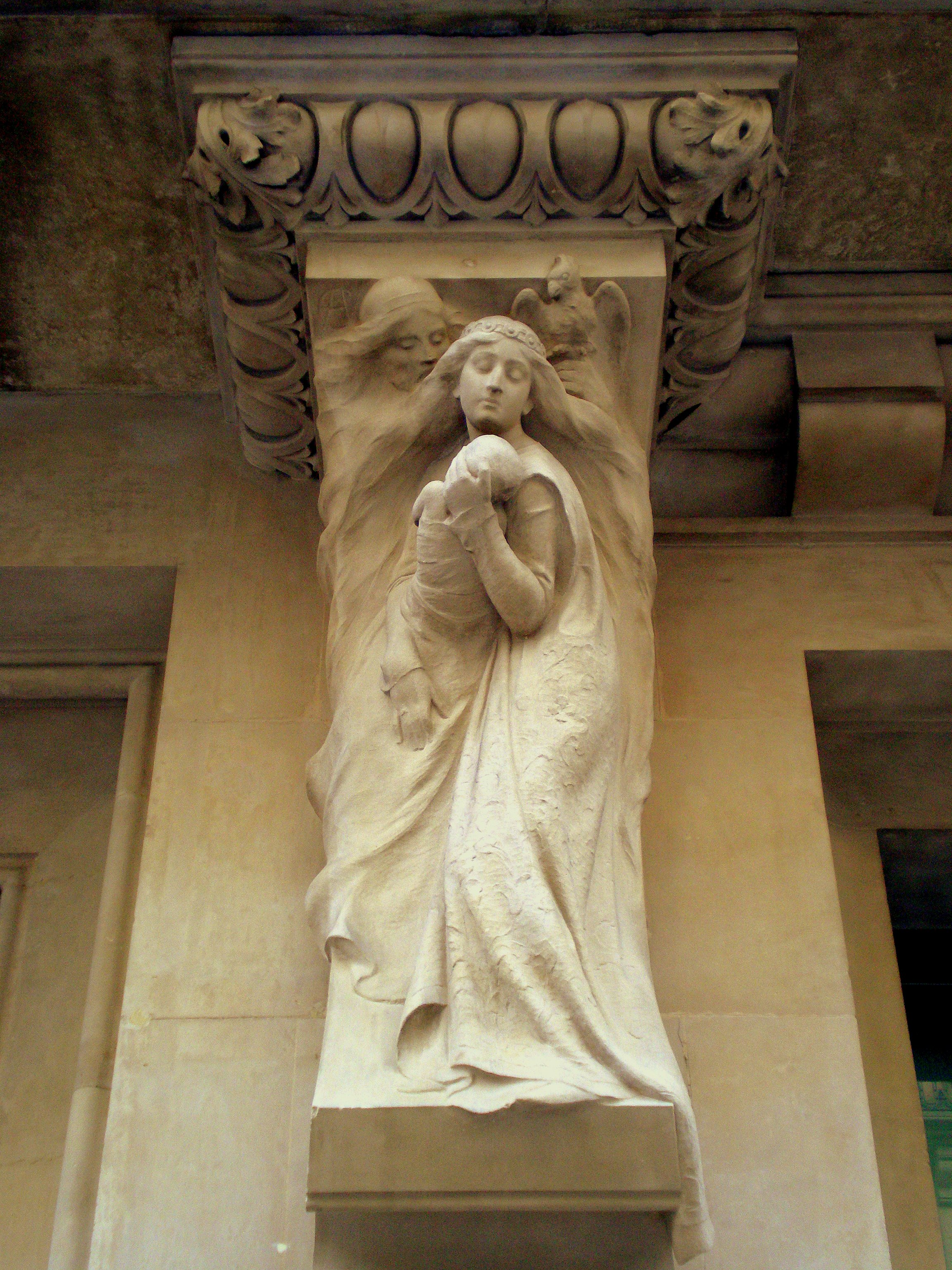

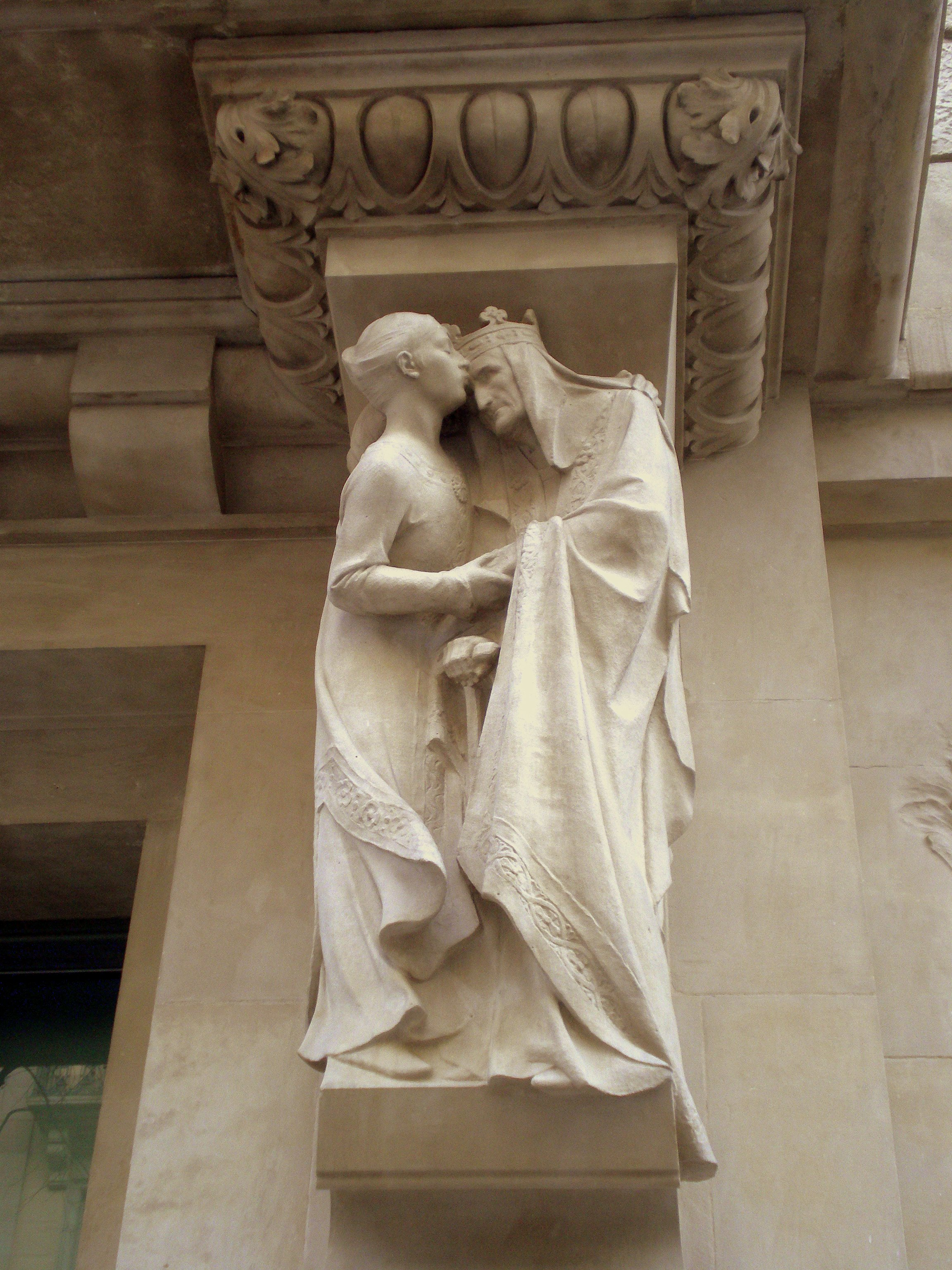

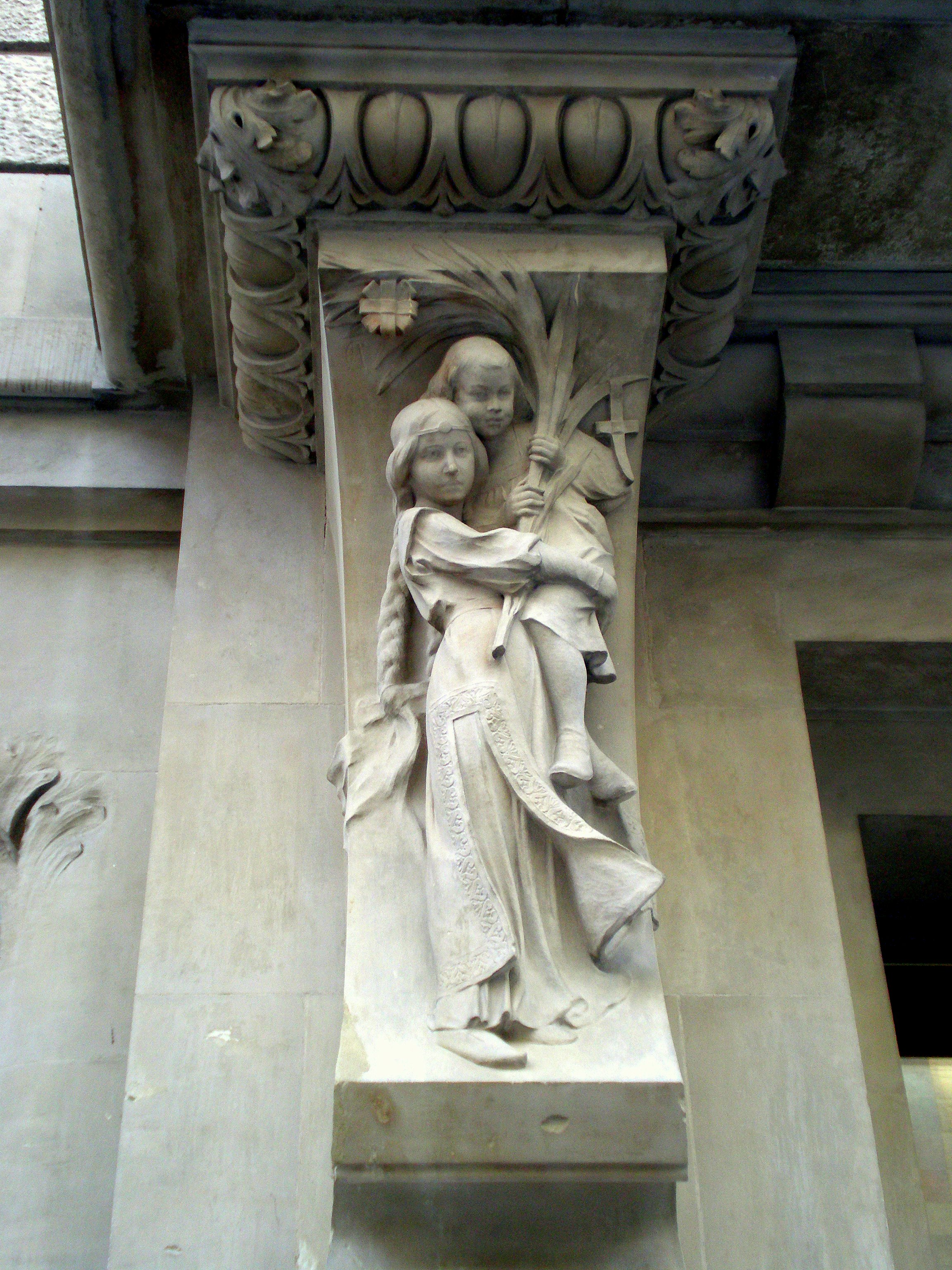

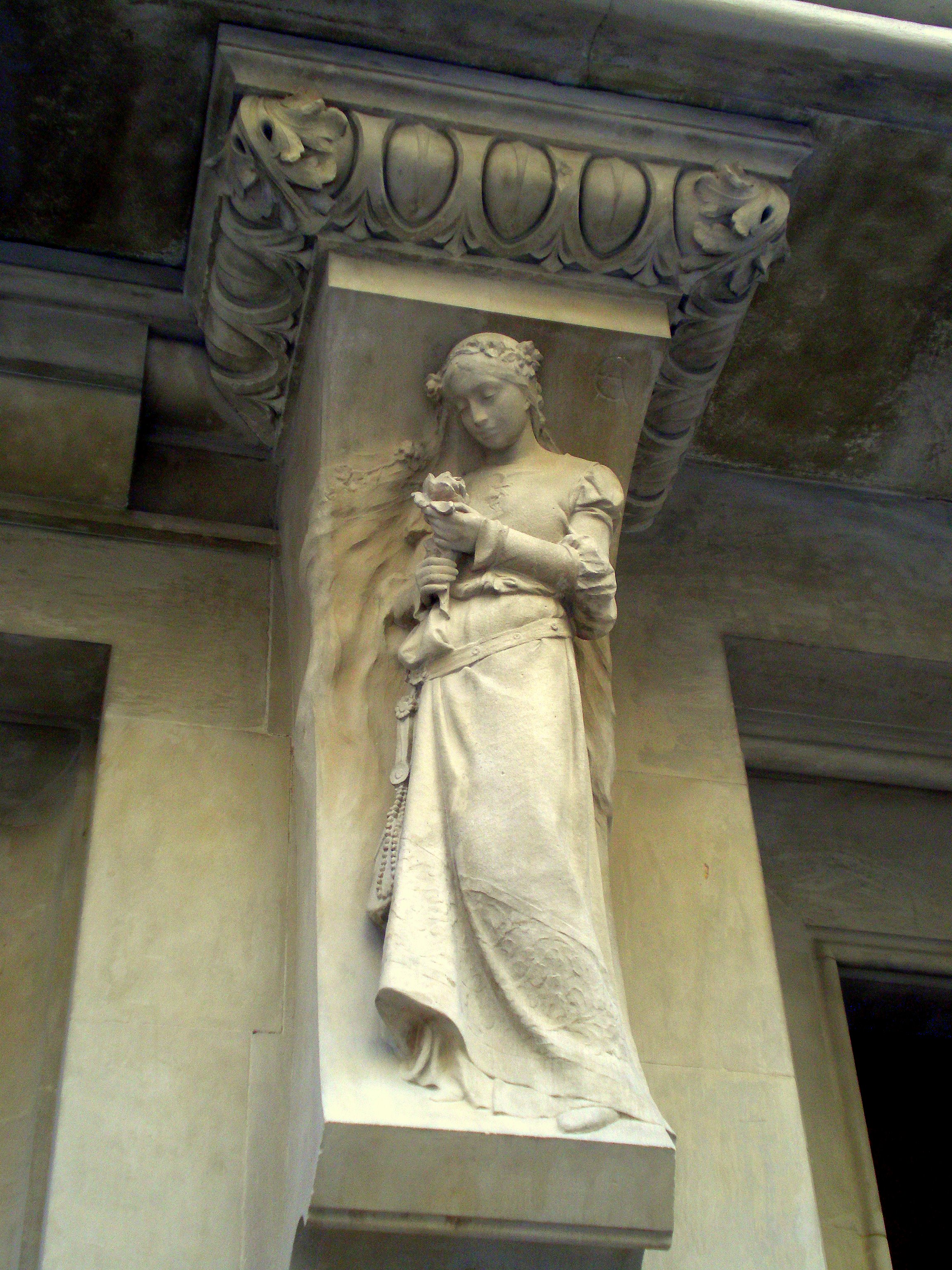
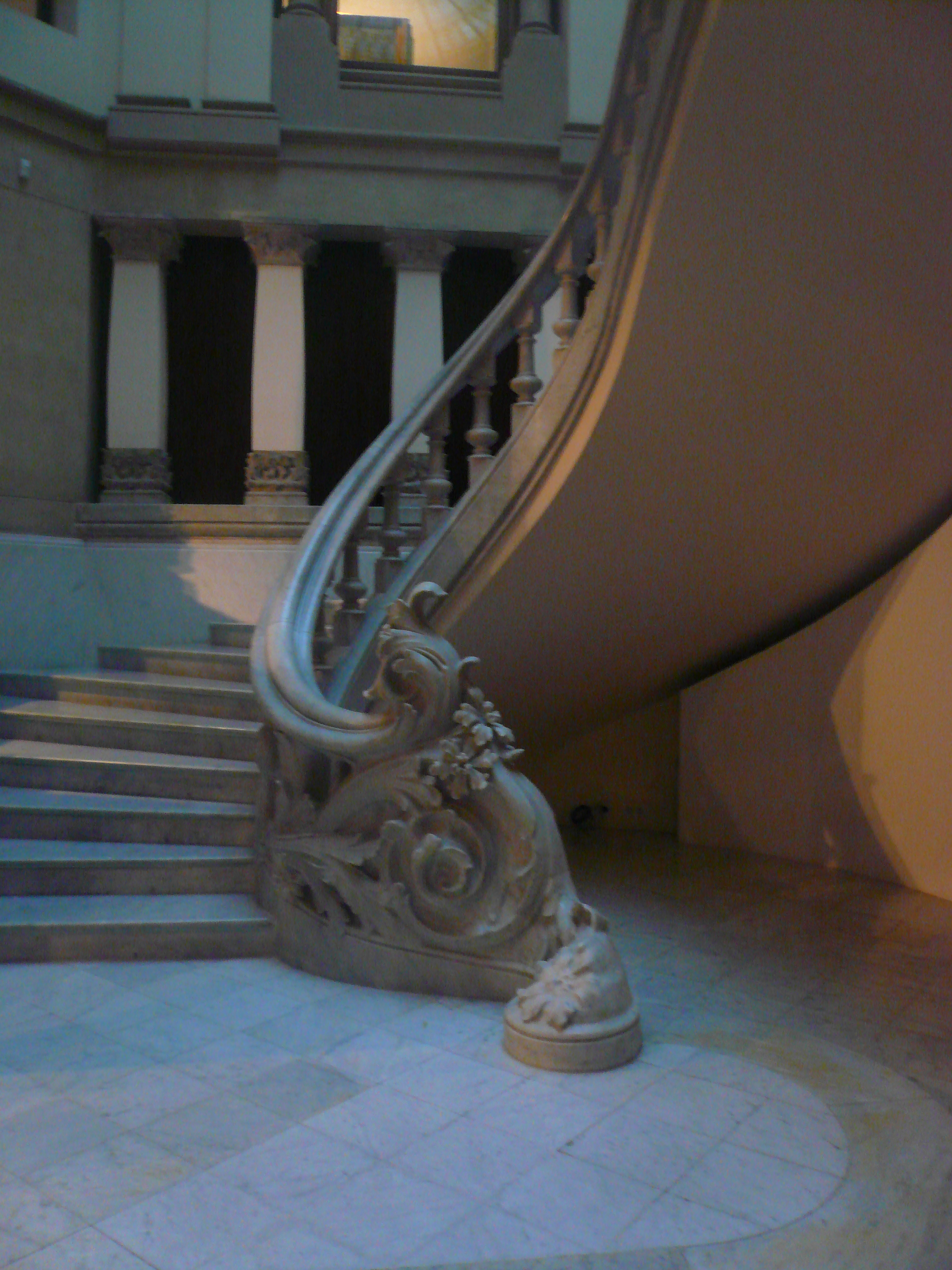

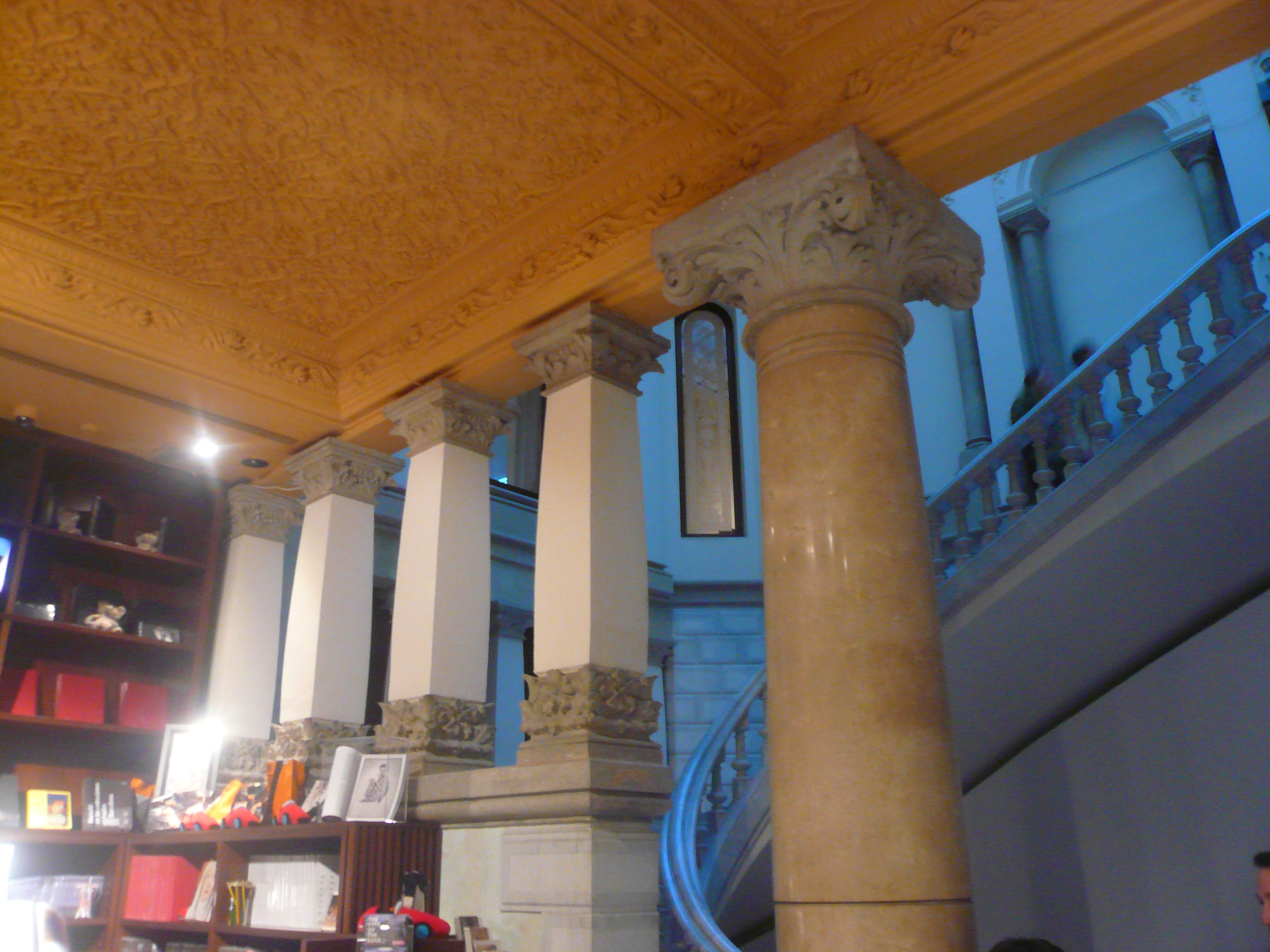

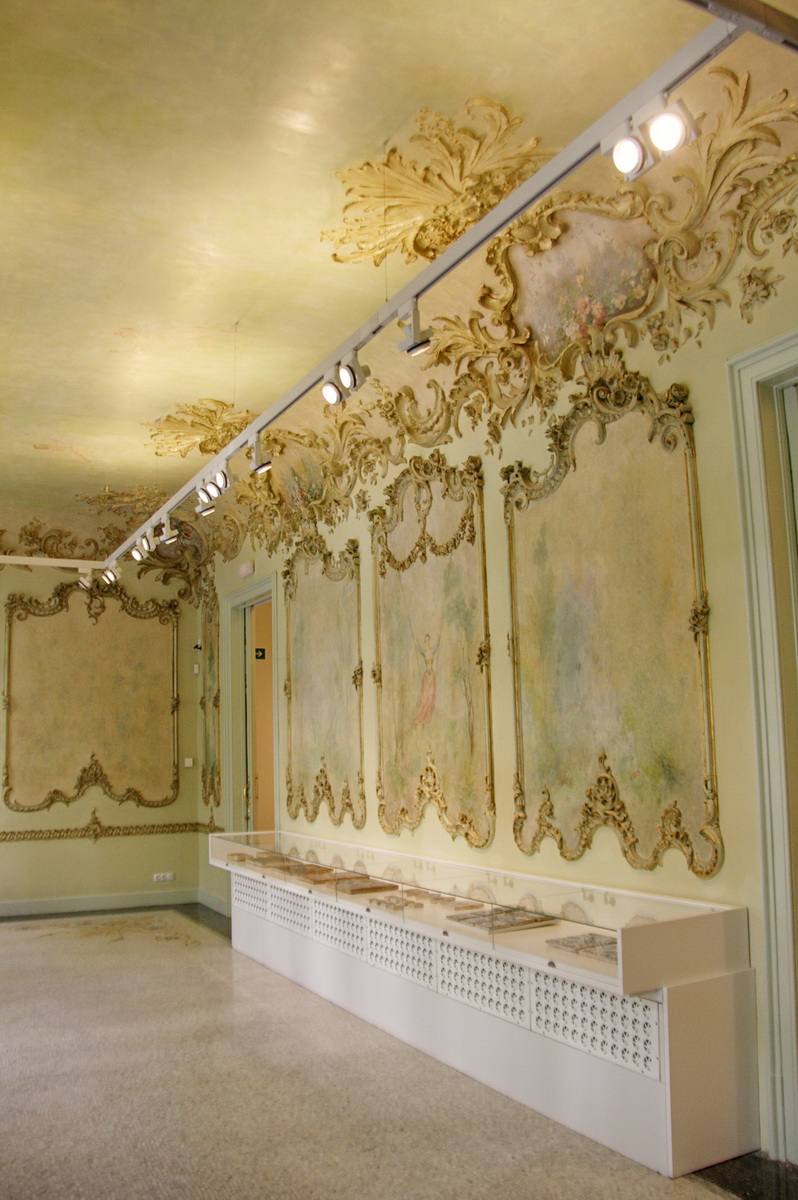

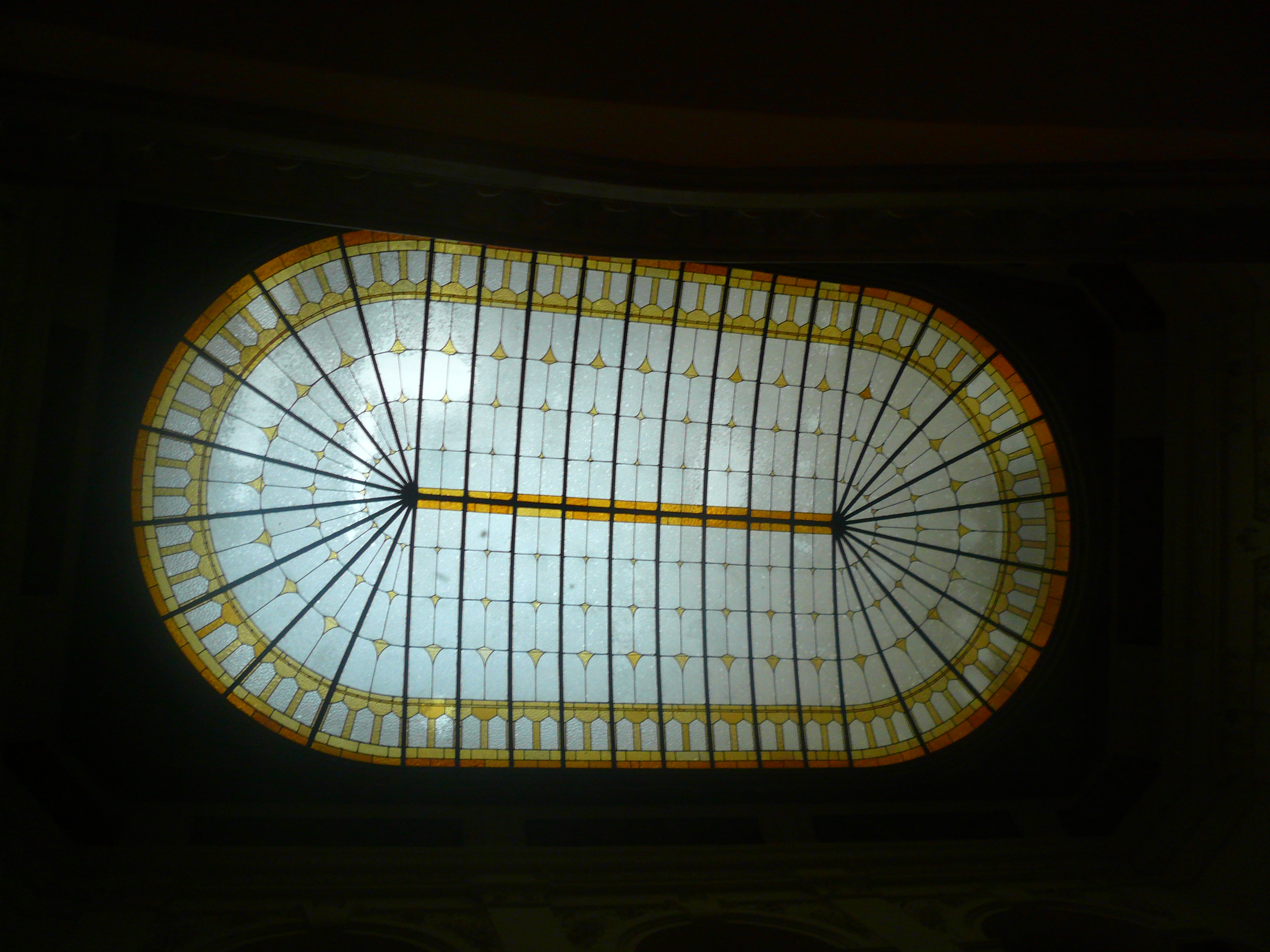

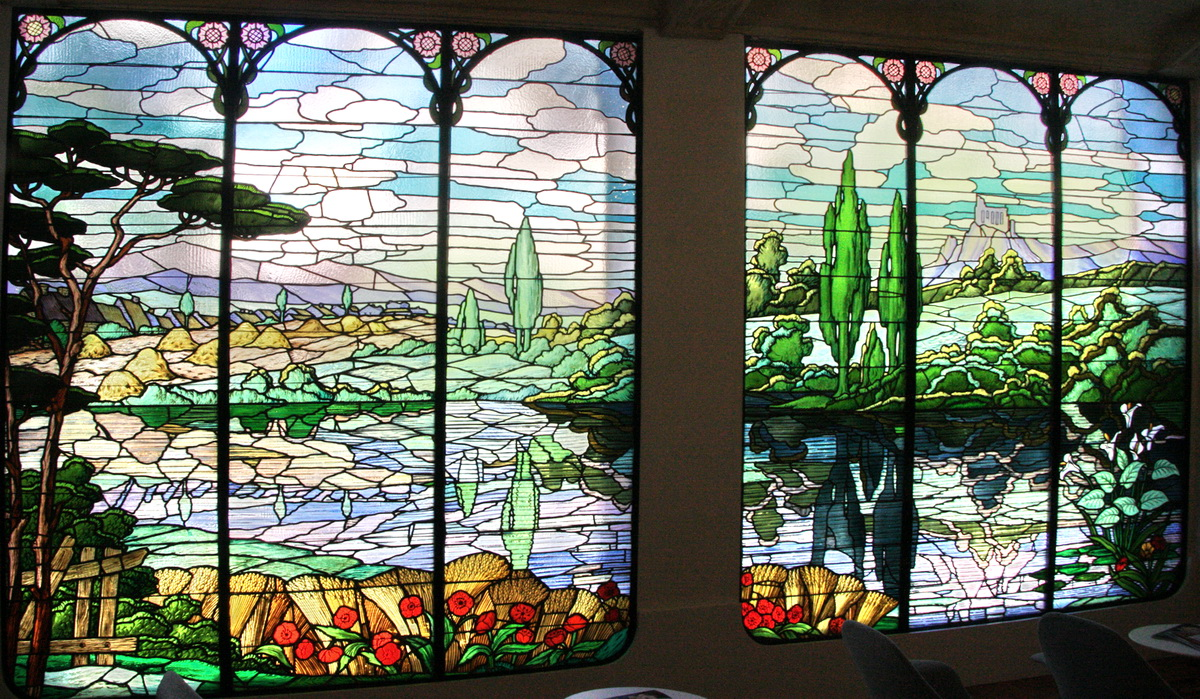
