= Dorotea de Chopitea =

Spanish philanthropist

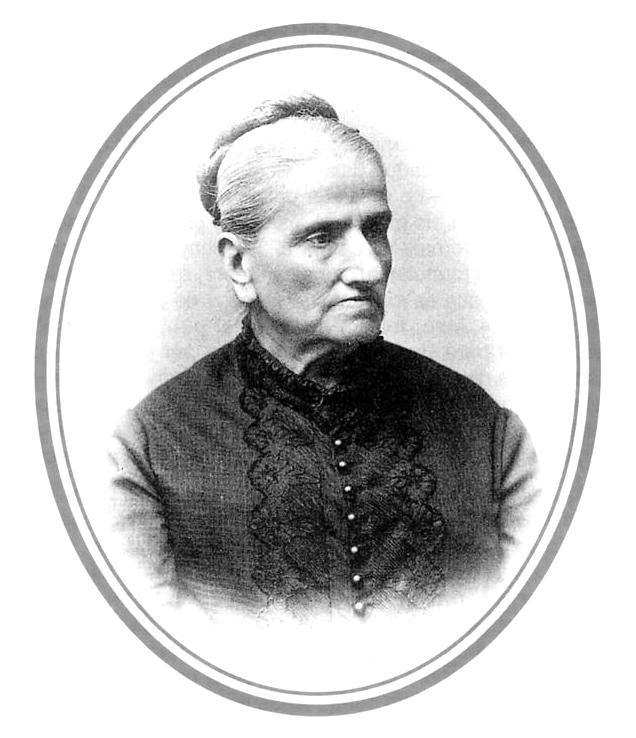
- Born: Antonia Dorotea de Chopitea de Villota; 4 June 1816
- Died: 3 April 1891 (aged 74); Barcelona, Spain
- Resting place: The Shrine of Mary, Help of Christians, Barcelona
- Occupations: philanthropist, social worker
- Known for: founder of numerous social establishments in Barcelona

Antonia Dorotea de Chopitea de Villota (4 June 1816, Santiago, Chile – 3 April 1891, Barcelona, Spain) was a Chile-born philanthropist and social worker based in Barcelona. She is considered the principal patroness and the most important social work promoter in Barcelona in the 19th century. She was declared Venerable by Pope John Paul II on 9 June 1983.

== Life ==
Antonia Dorotea de Chopitea de Villota was born on 4 June 1816 in Santiago, Chile, to Pedro Nicolás de Chopitea and Isabel de Villota. Her father was a royalist and after the proclamation of Independence of Chile his assets were confiscated. In 1819, the family was forced in to move to Spain and settled in Barcelona. In 1831, they briefly returned to Chile hoping to recover lost possessions and obtain compensation for their confiscated assets, however it was unsuccessful, and the family returned to Barcelona the same year.

At the age of 16, Chopitea married 22-year-old Josep Maria Serra Muñoz on 31 October 1832. The marriage was against the will of Chopitea's parents. Her husband later was among the founders of the Bank of Barcelona and the Maquinista Terrestre y Maritima, as well as a consul to the Chilean government in Barcelona.

Between 1834 and 1845 Chopitea became a mother of six daughters. They were named Dorotea, Ana María, Isabel, María Luisa, Carmen and Jesuina. One of the daughters died when she was 16.

In 1873, The Serra-Chopitea family settled in the Eixample, in a palace-house on the Gran Via de les Corts Catalanes (currently occupied by the Hotel Gran Vía).

Dorotea de Chopitea died on 3 April 1891 in Barcelona at the age of 74. In 1928, her remains were transferred from the cemetery of the Poblenou neighborhood to The Shrine of Mary, Help of Christians in Sarrià, founded by her.

== Philanthropy and social work ==
In 1835, after the protests and the burning of convents, Chopitea was determined to support the marginalized social strata and spend money for education of the working class youth. She had a vision that the key to solving the conflict was in improving the living conditions of the poor and marginalized.

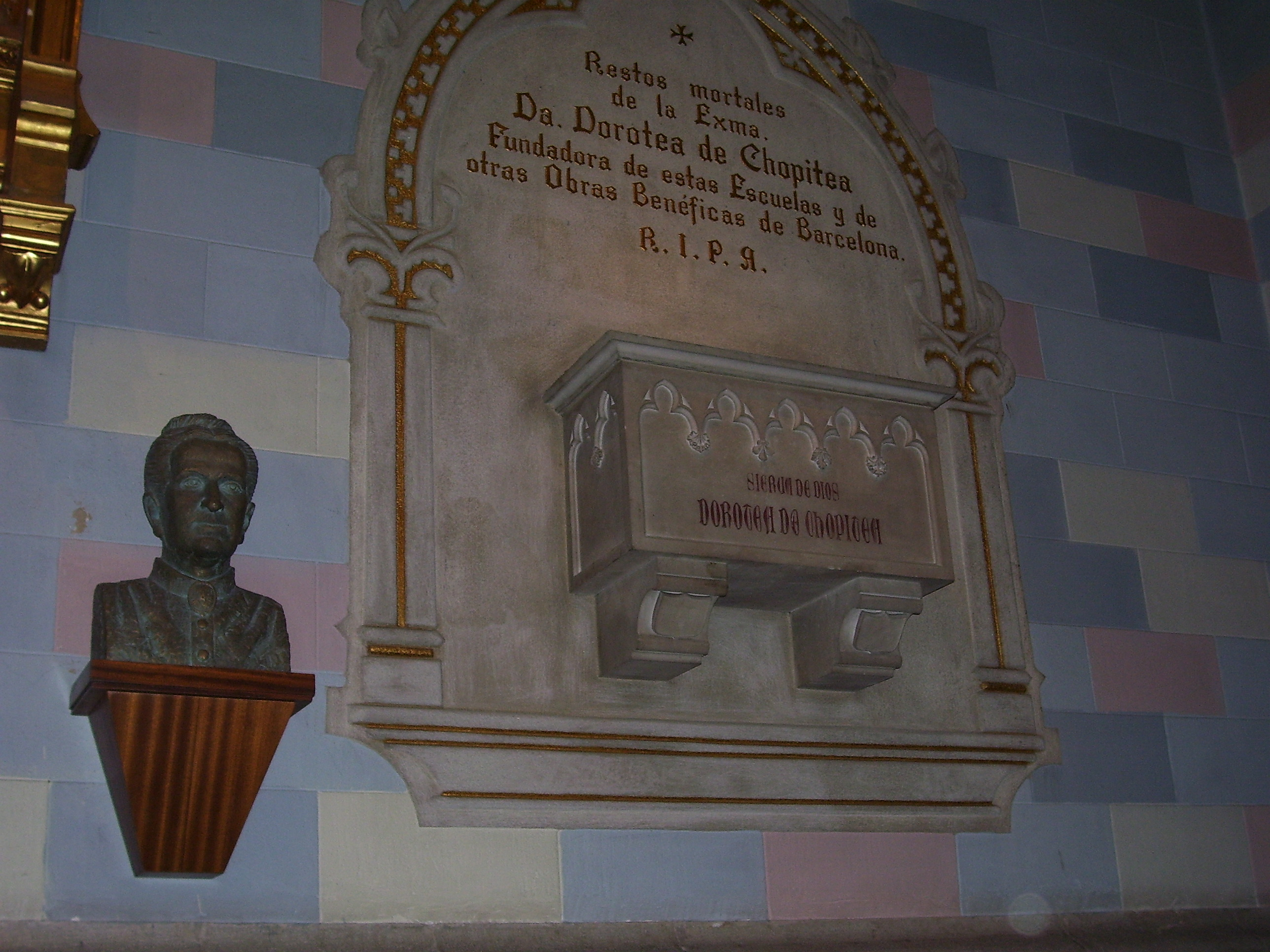
Marble tomb of Dorotea Chopitea in The Shrine of Mary, Help of Christians

Chopitea created an extensive network of support for the most disadvantaged by the industrial revolution. She founded hospitals, residences, schools and asylum rooms, where working mothers could leave their children, and workshops to teach craft to young people. It is estimated that in total around 30 foundations were the result of Chopitea's and her husband's charity. Only on Catalan lands four churches, fifteen schools, four hospitals and seven residences were founded by Chopitea. Additionally, she along with Presbitero Blas Cañas and the philanthropist Manuel Arriarán, made possible the foundation of the Salesian schools "Patrocinio de San Jose" and "Maria Auxiliadora" in Santiago and the so-called "Salesian Educational Center" in Talca, Chile.

Chopitea was the patroness of the order The Religious of the Sacred Heart, often called, the Madames of the Sacred Heart, that founded an advanced academy with social prestige for daughters of the elite to teach behavior and expectations appropriate to the upper class. The order has served the daughters of wealthy Catholic families in Europe, Latin America and the United States.
After the death of her husband in 1882, Chopitea donated a half of what she had inherited from him to the poor. The same year she met John Bosco, the founder of Salesian order, and became its benefactor financing the temple of Tibidado dedicated to the Sacred Heart.

== Commemoration and beatification process ==
Following the death of Chopitea three her biographies appeared: in 1892 by the Jesuit Jaume Nonell, in 1926 by Jesuit Jacint Alegre, and in 1962 by the Salesian Amadeo Burdeus.

Numerous religious orders agreed that she had died as a saint. In 1927, the Salesian congregation started the process of beatification of Chopitea. Her spiritual writings were approved by theologians on 4 May 1952. Pope John Paul I declared her Venerable on 9 June 1983.

On the occasion of bicentenary of Chopitea's birth a documentary Dorothy de Chopitea, a lady of Barcelona was shot. The objective of the film is to advocate her legacy and reveal her personality to spread information about her contributions.

== List of foundations ==
=== Temples (5) ===
- Iglesia del Sagrado Corazón
- Iglesia de San José
- Santuario y Parroquia de María Auxiliadora
- Basílica y Parroquia del Sagrado Corazón
- Parroquía de San Eugenio I Papa

=== Schools (15) ===
- Sagrat Cor-Sarrià
- Sagrat Cor-Aldana
- Sagrada Família
- Jesuïtes de Casp
- Salesians de Sarrià
- Salesianes de Sarrià
- Salesians de Rocafort
- La Salle Barceloneta
- Sant Joan Baptista Barceloneta
- Jesuïtes de Sarrià
- Assumpció
- Sagrat Cor-Diputació
- La Salle Gràcia
- Sant Vicenç de Paül
- La Salle Les Corts. Avda. Sarrià 8
- La Salle Poble-sec. Blay 42

=== Hospitals (4) ===
- Hospital de Sant Joan de Déu (Germans de Sant Joan de Déu)
- Hospital Sant Rafael (Hospitalàries del Sagrat Cor de Jesús)
- Hospital del Sagrat Cor (Hospitalàries del Sagrat Cor de Jesús)
- Hospital de Nens de Barcelona

=== Residences (7) ===
- Asilo de San Juan Bautista
- Asilo de San Rafael
- Residencia de María Reparadora (Reparadoras)
- Residencia y Centro Social de María Inmaculada (Religiosas de María Inmaculada)
- Asilo de la calle de la Luna
- Asilo del Buen Consejo (Dominicas de la Presentación)
- Asilo de ancianos (Hermanitas de los Pobres)
