= Josep Domènech i Estapà =

Catalan architect

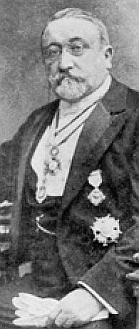
Josep Domènech i Estapà

Josep Domènech i Estapà (Catalan pronunciation: [ʒuˈzɛb duˈmɛnək i əstəˈpa]; Tarragona, 1858 – Cabrera de Mar, 1917) was a Catalan architect.

He graduated in 1881, and became professor of geodesy in 1888 and subsequently descriptive geometry in 1895 at the University of Barcelona. He became a member of the Acadèmia de Ciències i Arts in 1883, and its president in 1914.

His works in Barcelona include the church of Sant Andreu del Palomar (1881, with Pere Falqués), Teatre Poliorama and Reial Acadèmia de les Ciències (1883), Palau de la Justícia - Palace of Justice courthouse (1887-1908, with Enric Sagnier i Villavecchia), Palau Montaner, now the Delegación del Gobierno Español (Delegation of the Spanish Government) in Barcelona (1889-1896, with Lluís Domènech i Montaner), the University of Barcelona's Faculty of Medicine (1904), Modelo prison (1904, with Salvador Vinyals i Sabaté), the Amparo de Santa Lucía / Empar de Santa Llúcia home for the blind, which eventually became the Museu de la Ciència de Barcelona, now known as CosmoCaixa Barcelona (1904-1909), the Fabra Observatory (1906), Catalana de Gas i electricitat building and water tower (1908), the Church of Our Lady of Carmen (Església de la Mare de Déu del Carme) and Carmelite convent (1910-1921, finished by his son Josep Domènech i Mansana) and Magoria station (1912). He also headed the construction of the Hospital Clínic (1895-1906), based on a design by Ignasi C. Bartrolí (1881). In the town of Viladrau, he built the Hotel Bofill (1898).

He created his own style through the modification of Classical motifs, distinct both from Eclecticism and Modernisme, but was accepted by the establishment. He wrote several books, including Tratado de geometría descriptiva and El modernismo arquitectónico (1911).

== Gallery ==
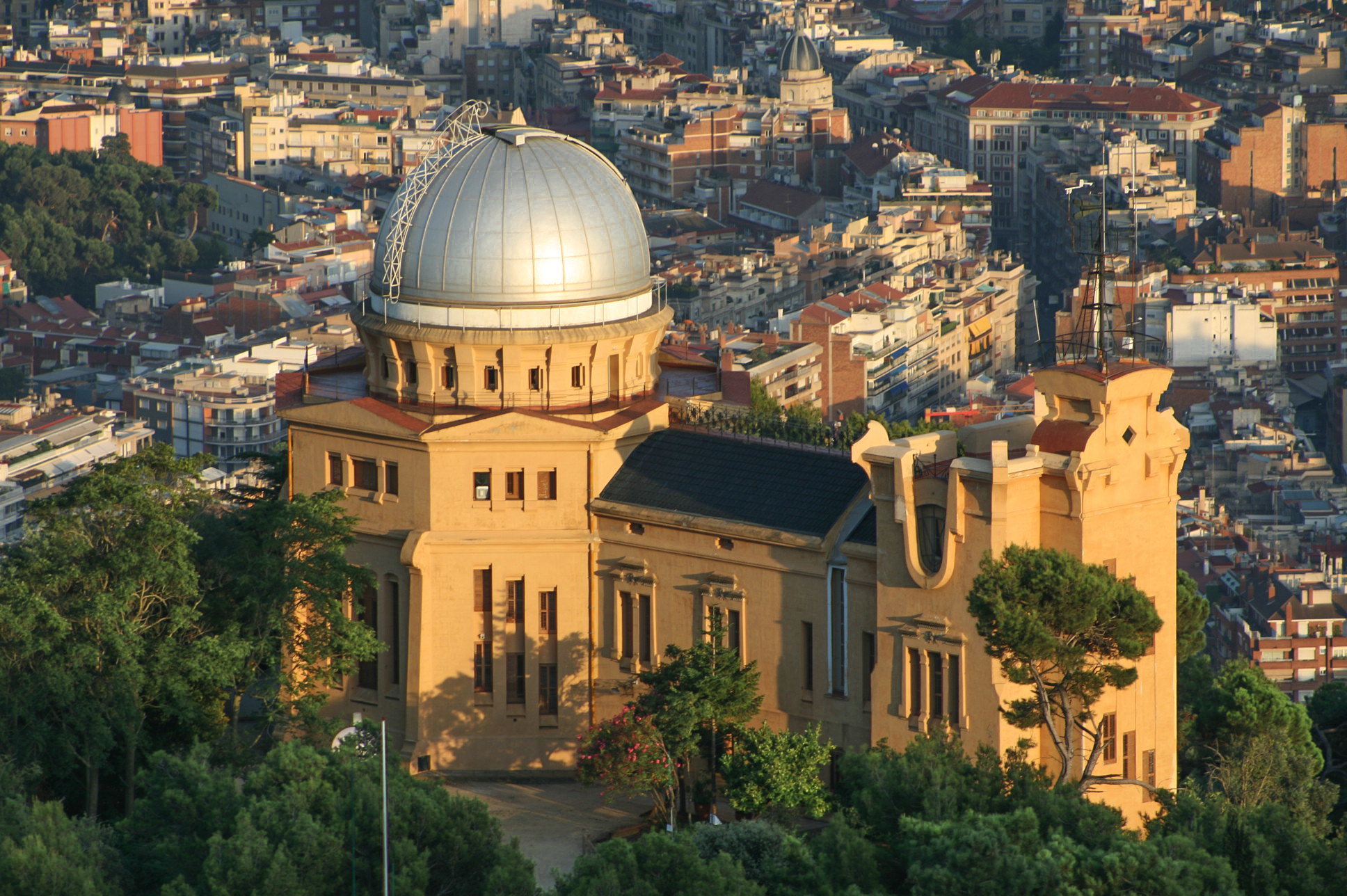
Fabra Observatory on Collserola, Barcelona

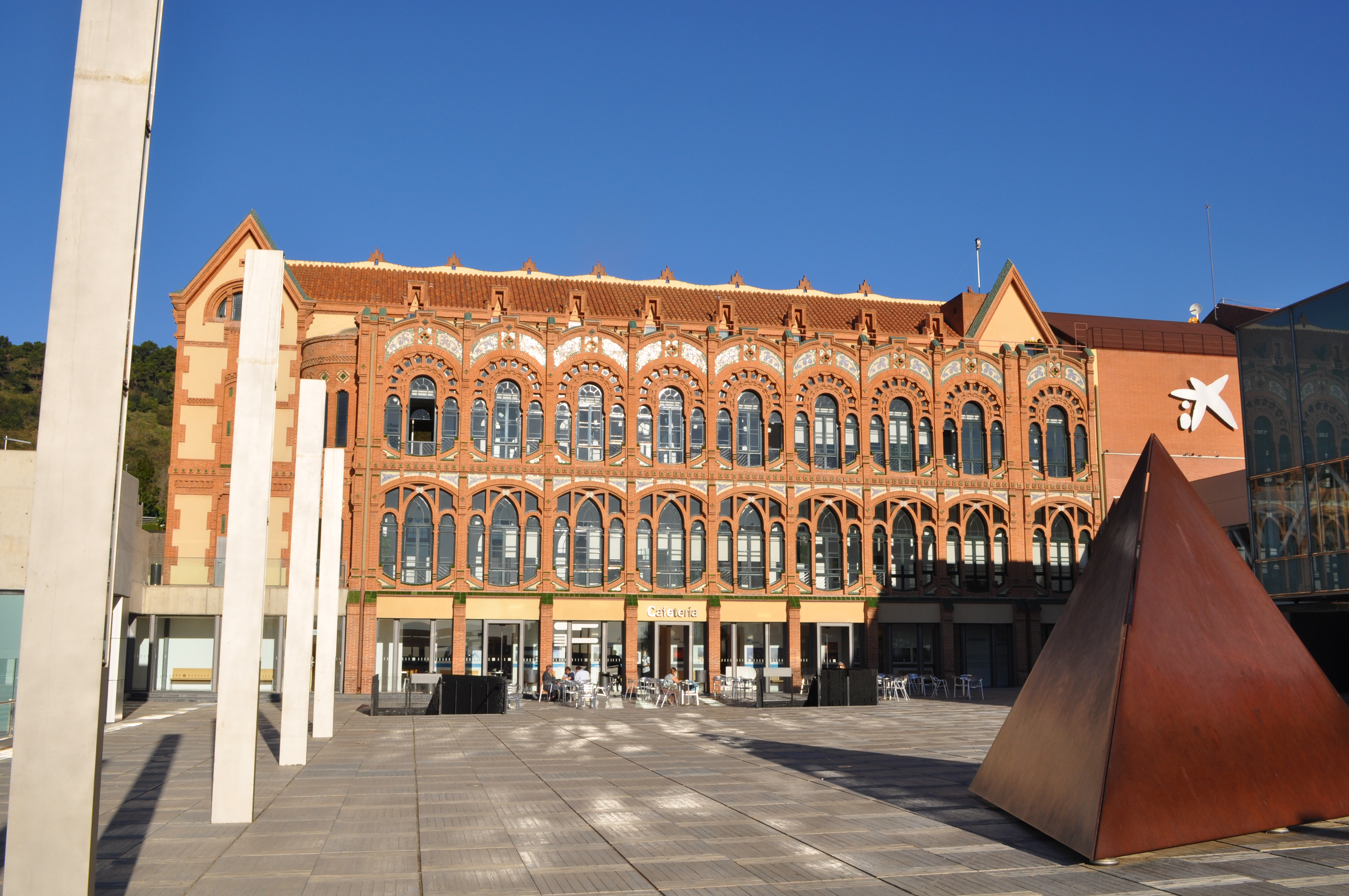
The Empar de Santa Llúcia home for the blind, now CosmoCaixa - Museum of Science, Barcelona

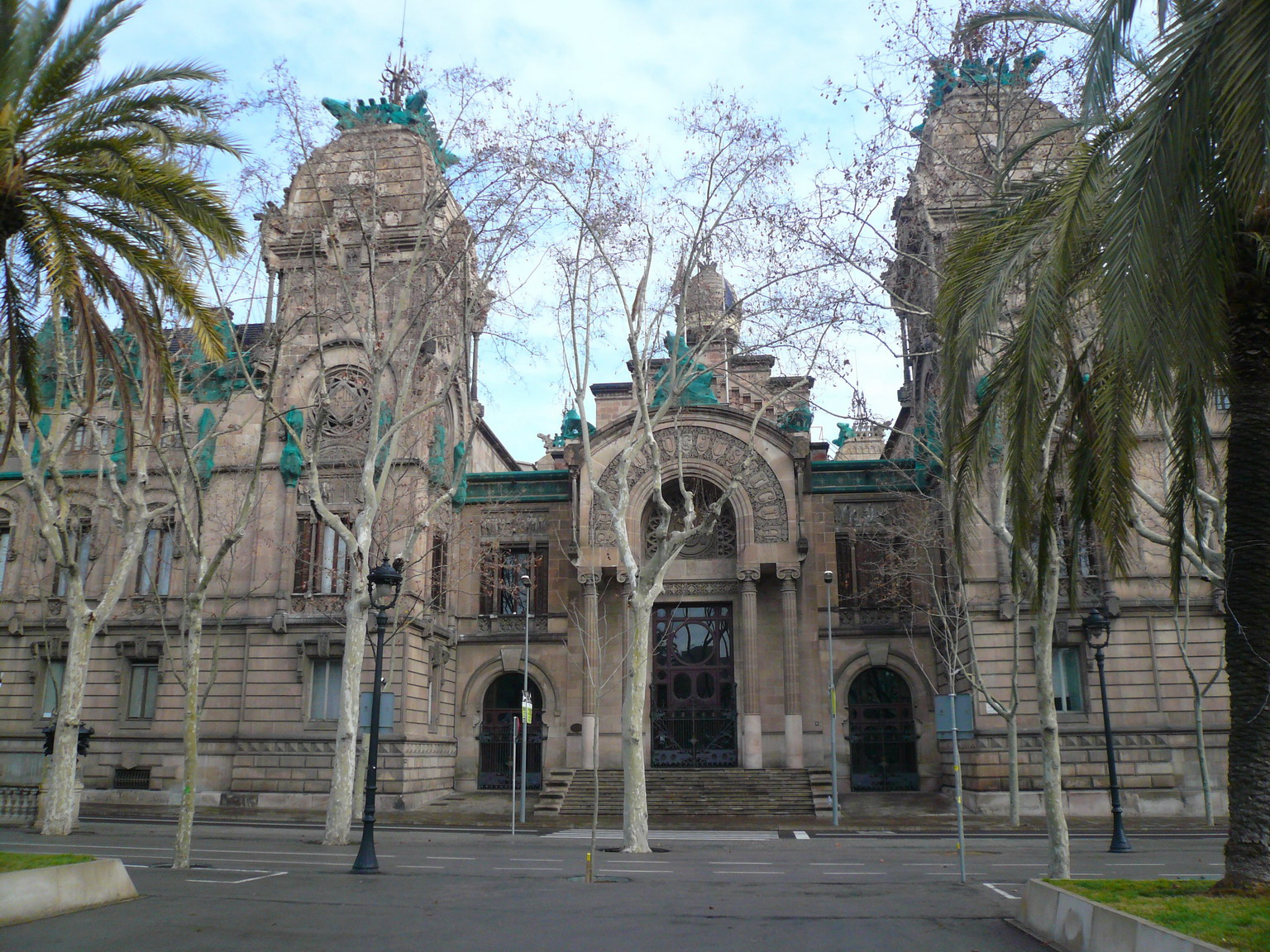
Palau de la Justícia - Palaca of Justice in Barcelona (with the details covered in a Christo-like wrapping), built together with Enric Sagnier i Villavecchia.

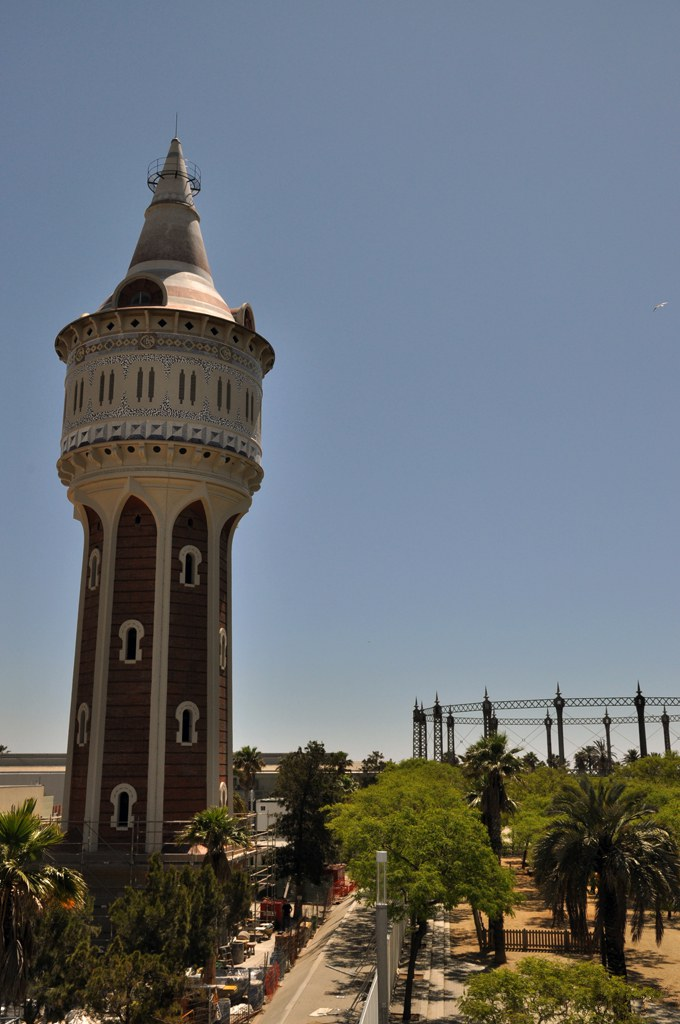
Torre de la Catalana de Gas - La Catalana de Gas water tower, Barcelona, full view.

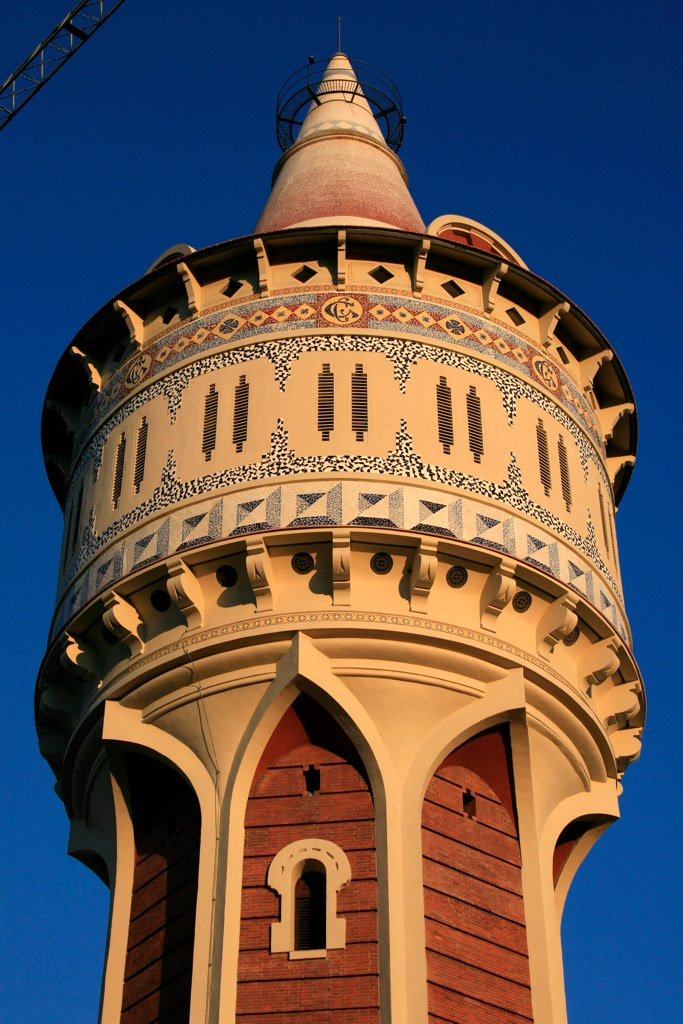
Torre de la Catalana de Gas - La Catalana de Gas water tower, Barcelona, detail.

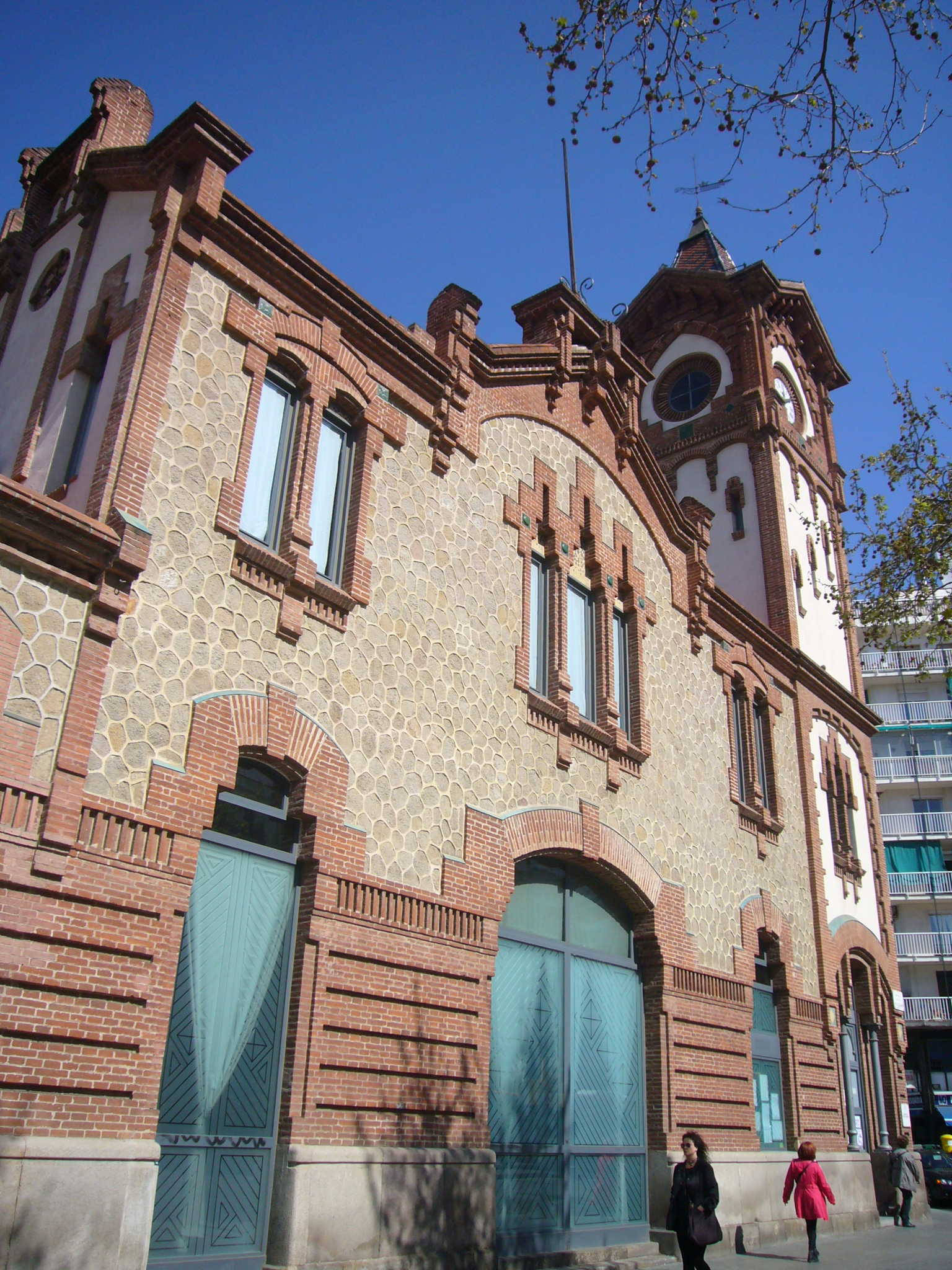
Magòria Station, Barcelona

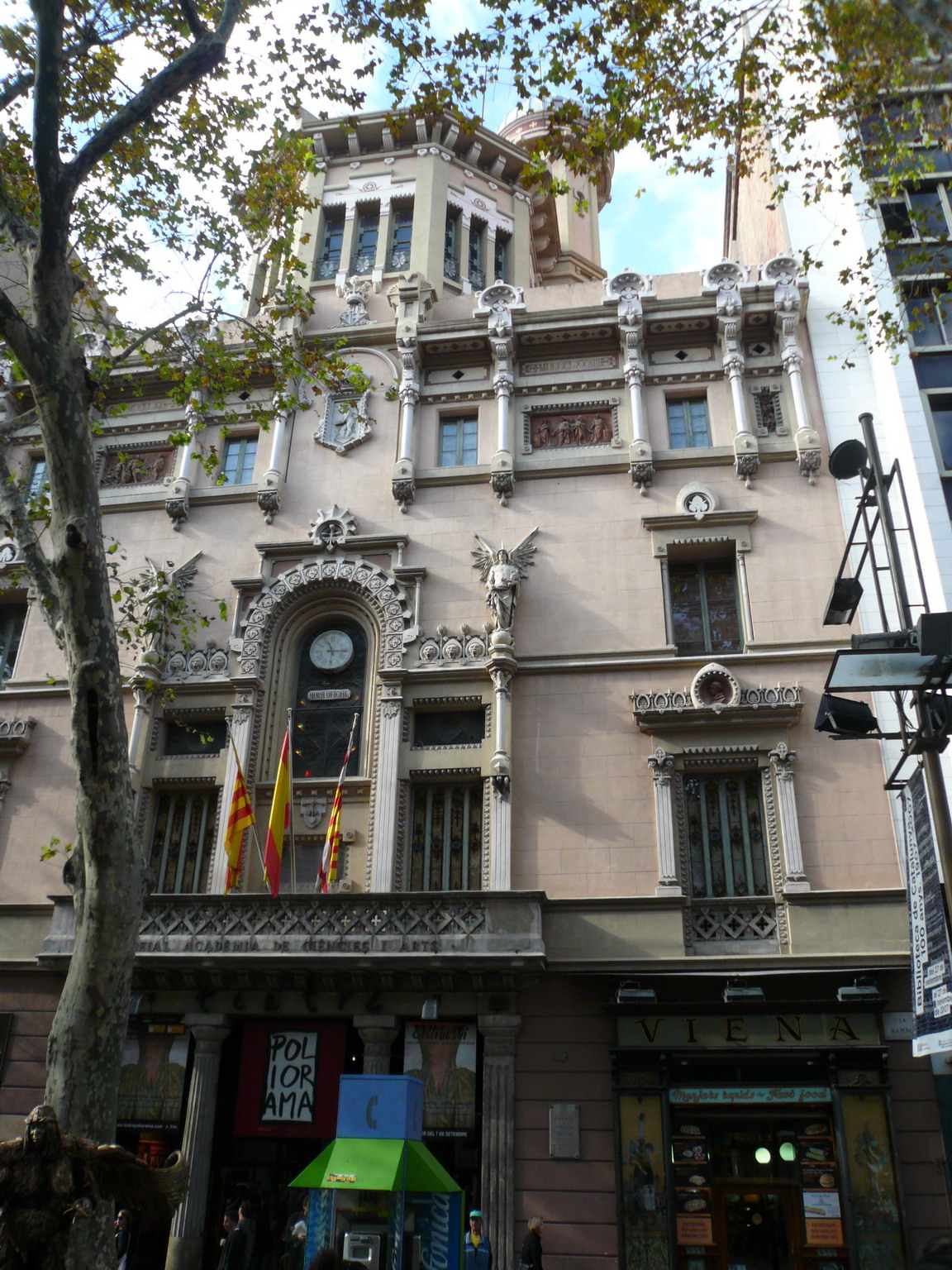
Reial Acadèmia de Ciències i Arts - Royal Academy of Sciences and Arts / Teatre Poliorama, Barcelona, Rambles.

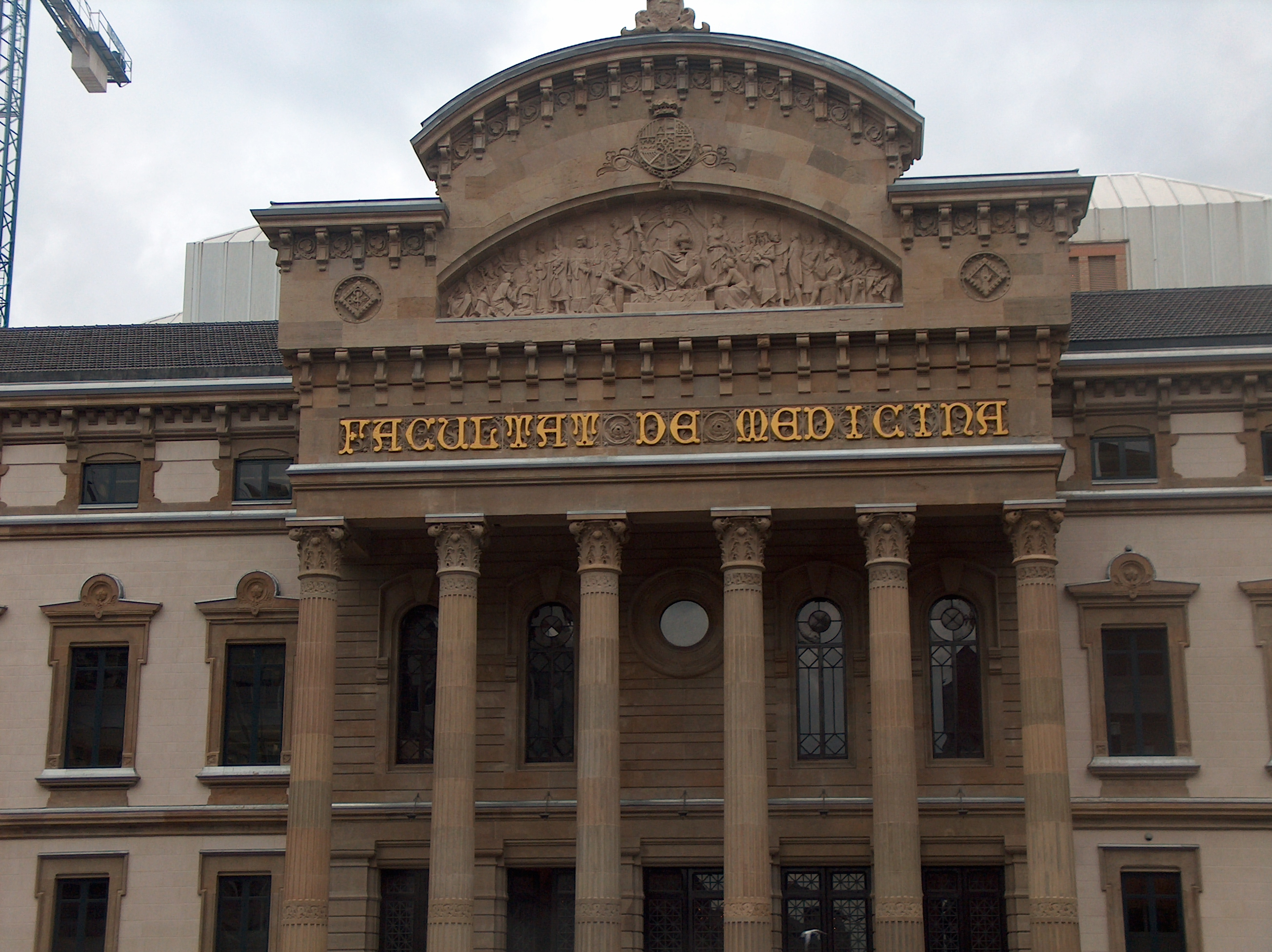
University of Barcelona, Faculty of Medicine, Barcelona.

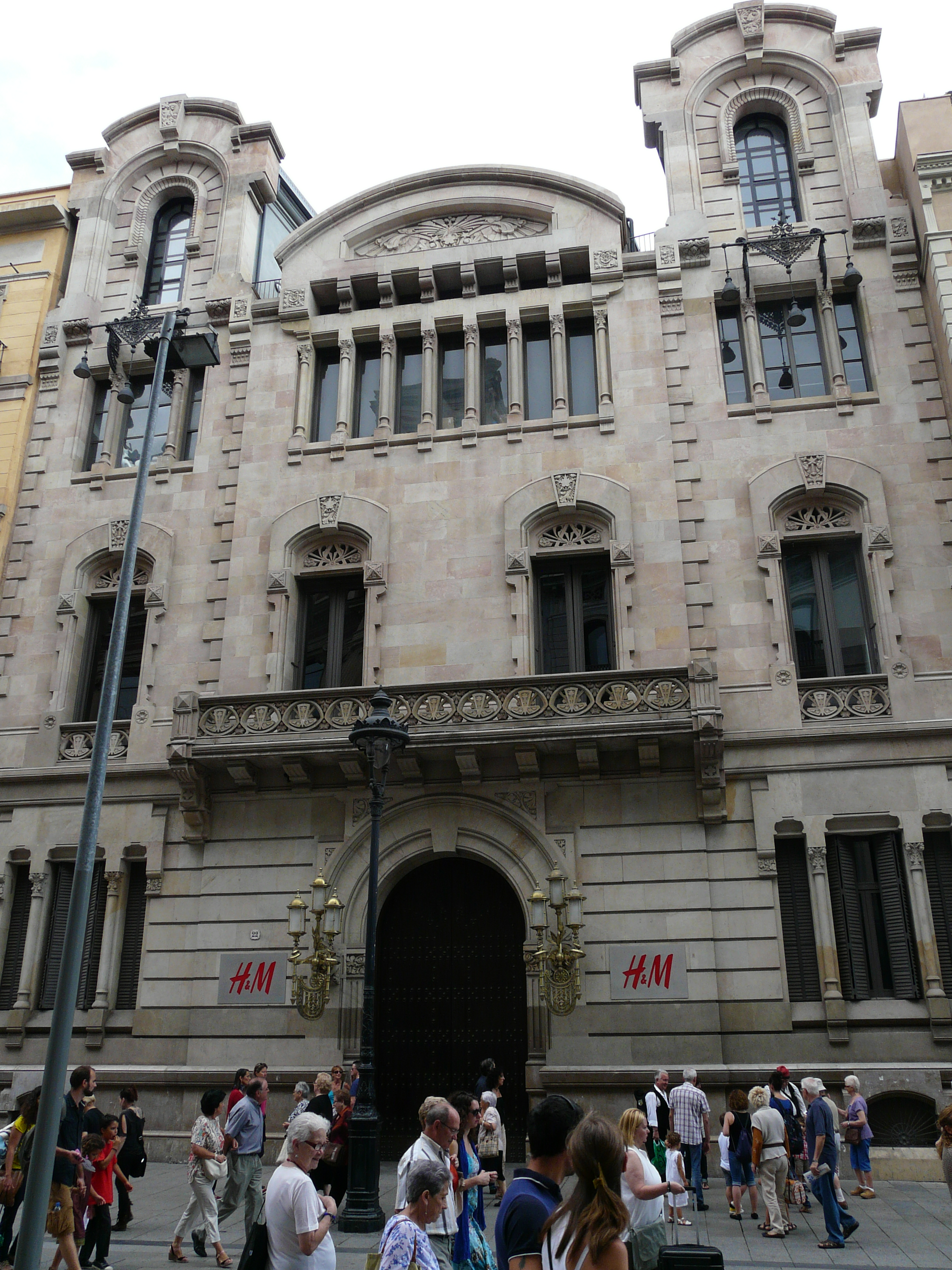
Former headquarters of the utilities company, Catalana de Gas i Electricitat, Barcelona.

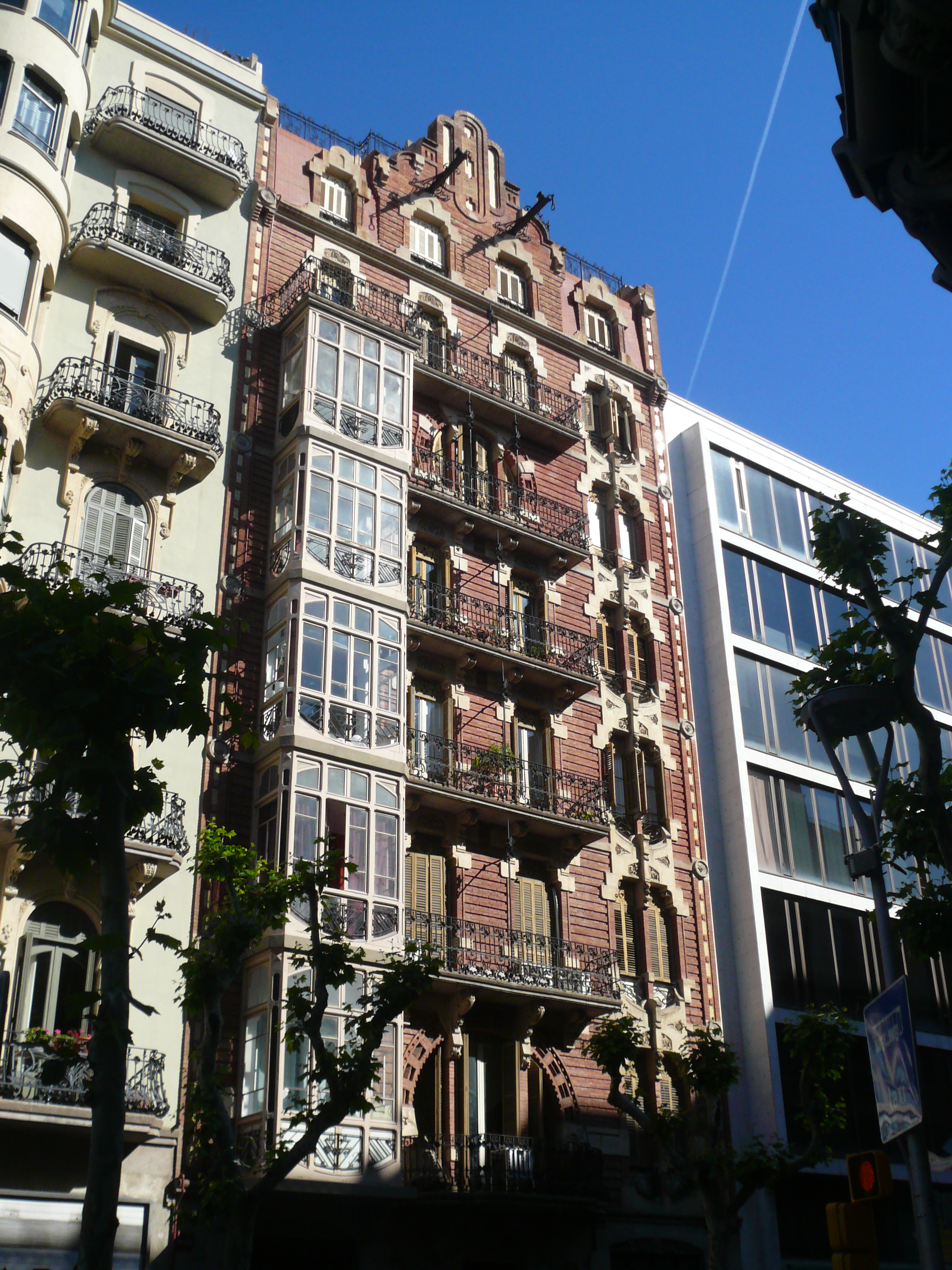
Casa Domènech i Estapà, Barcelona.

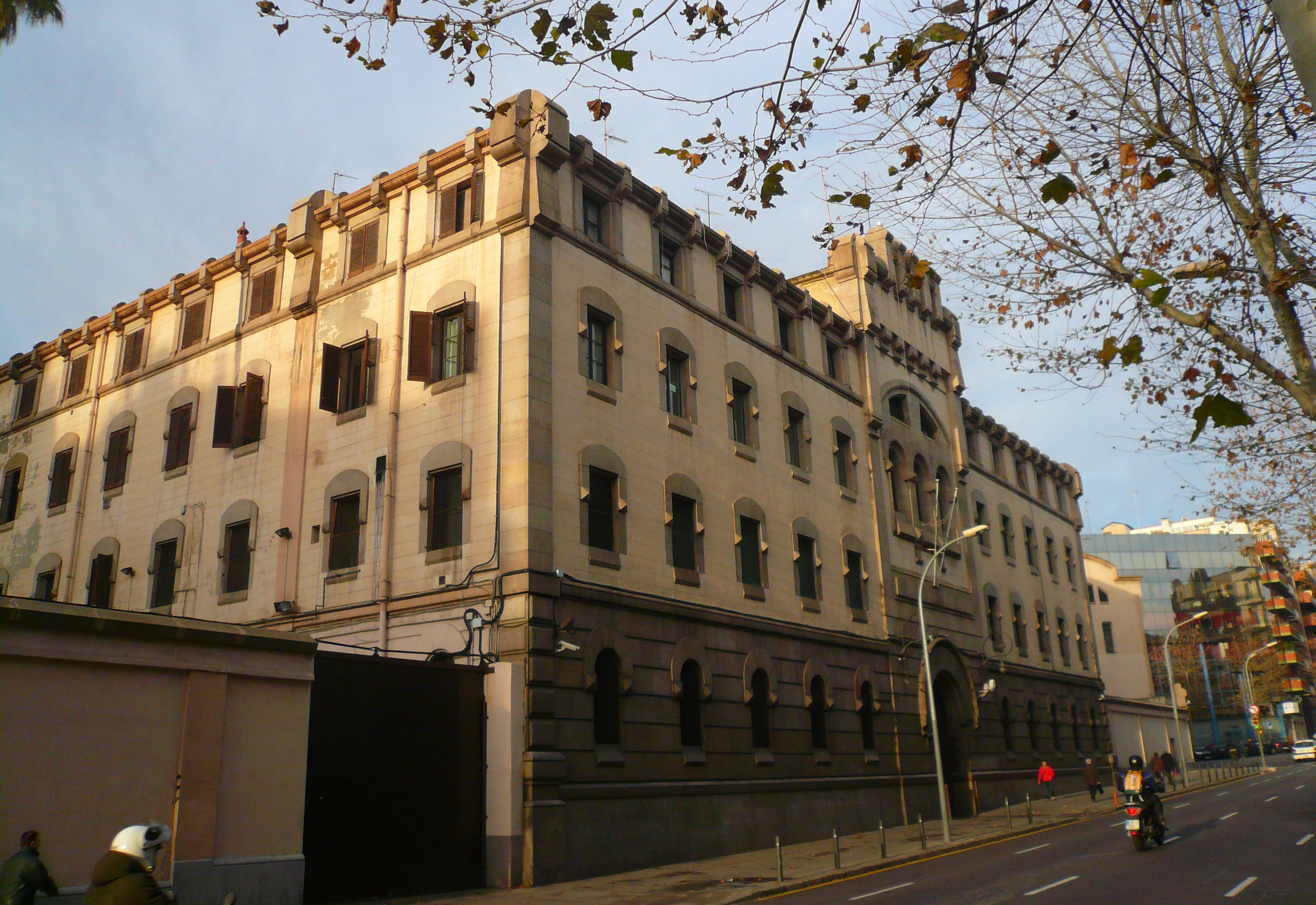
Model Prison (built in conjunction with Salvador Vinyals i Sabaté), Barcelona
