= Caniles =

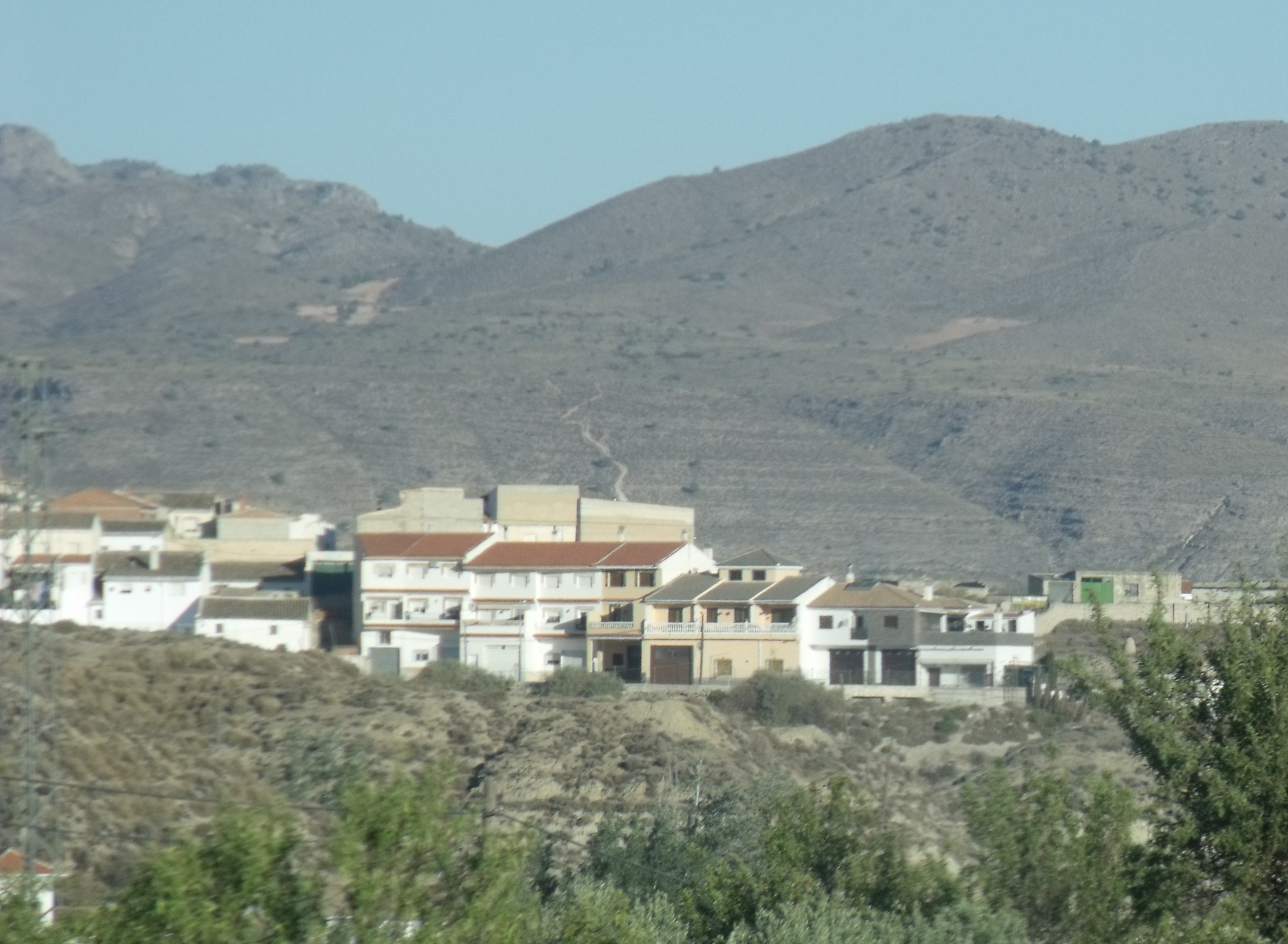
- General view of Caniles (2016)

- Coat of arms

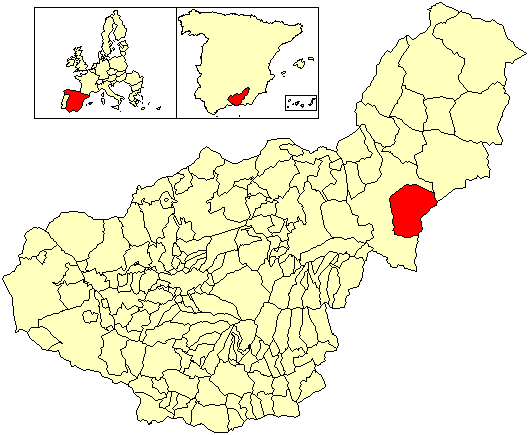
- Location of Caniles
- Coordinates: 37°26′N 2°43′W
- Country: Spain
- Province: Granada
- Municipality: Caniles

Area
  - Total: 216 km^{2} (83 sq mi)
- Elevation: 911 m (2,989 ft)

Population (2025-01-01)
  - Total: 3,929
  - Density: 18.2/km^{2} (47.1/sq mi)
- Time zone: UTC+1 (CET)
  - Summer (DST): UTC+2 (CEST)

Caniles is a village located in the province of Granada, Spain. According to the 2005 census (INE), the city has a population of 4849 inhabitants.

== See also ==
- List of municipalities in Granada
