= Magic Fountain =

Magic Fountain may refer to:

- The Magic Fountain (opera), written by Frederick Delius between 1893 and 1895
- The Magic Fountain, a 1961 film
- Magic Fountain (film), a 1963 film
- Magic Fountain (EP), an EP by Art vs. Science
  - "Magic Fountain" (song)
- Magic Fountain of Montjuïc, in Barcelona
