= The Experiment (Art vs. Science album) =

Studio album by Art vs. Science
- Released: 25 February 2011
- Recorded: 2010
- Studios: Brisbane; Sydney
- Label: Art vs. Science
- Producers: Art vs. Science, Magoo, Berkfinger, Eric J. Dubowsky

Art vs. Science chronology
Magic Fountain (2010)	The Experiment (2011)	Create / Destroy (2014)

Singles from The Experiment
- 1. "Finally See Our Way" Released: November 2010; 2. "A.I.M. Fire!" Released: April 2011; 3. "Higher" Released: June 2011; 4. "With Thoughts" Released: August 2011

The Experiment is the debut studio album by Australian electronic band Art vs. Science. The album was released on 25 February 2011 and debuted at number 2 on the ARIA Albums Chart. At the J Awards of 2011, the album was nominated for Australian Album of the Year. At the ARIA Music Awards of 2011, it won the Best Independent Release.

== Reception ==
Rolling Stone awarded the album 4 out of 5 stars, saying that the "debut album from festival favourites perfectly captures their intense, slightly crazy live spirit".

The Vine praised the band and the album, saying its "packed from top to toe with fist-pumping, bass-throbbing anthems, the cheek of Art vs. Science might be the only thing saving the kids from utter blandness".

Mess and Noise gave the record a poor review saying, "The album could be easily dismissed as a one-note act making hay while the sun still shines on their blissfully brainless patch of land".

The Daily Telegraph proclaimed "this is Australian pop music to be proud of".

Australian street press was unified in its praise of the album, with The Brag, Drum Media, Beat and Time Off all awarding the band 4 out of 5 and Album of the Week status.

== Track listing ==
All tracks are written by Art Vs. Science.

The Experiment
No.	Title	Length
1.	"Finally See Our Way"	4:24
2.	"Take a Look at Your Face"	4:07
3.	"A.I.M. Fire!"	3:59
4.	"Higher"	3:52
5.	"Magic Fountain"	4:27
6.	"With Thoughts"	4:25
7.	"Meteor (I Feel Fine)"	4:57
8.	"Rain Dance"	5:01
9.	"Sledgehammer"	3:40
10.	"New World Order"	5:45
11.	"Bumblebee"	3:40
12.	"Heavy Night"	3:40
13.	"Before You Came to This Place"	4:46
14.	"Finally See Our Way" (Linus Loves remix [iTunes bonus track])	6:10

== Personnel ==
Credits:

Art vs. Science

- Jim Finn: synthesisers, vocals
- Dan McNamee: guitar, vocals, synthesisers
- Dan Williams: drums, vocals

Recording

- Producer: Art vs. Science, Berkfinger (Simon Berckelman, tracks: 4, 5, 10, 13), Eric J. Dubowsky (track 13), Magoo (Lachlan Goold, tracks: 1, 2, 3, 6, 8, 9, 12)
- Mixer: Adrian Bushby

== Charts ==
Chart (2011)	Peak position
Australian Albums (ARIA)	2

== Release history ==
Country	Date	Format	Label	Catalogue
Australia	25 February 2011	Digital download, CD,	Art vs. Science	AVS003
