= 1929 Barcelona International Exposition =

International exhibition in Barcelona, Spain

1929 Barcelona
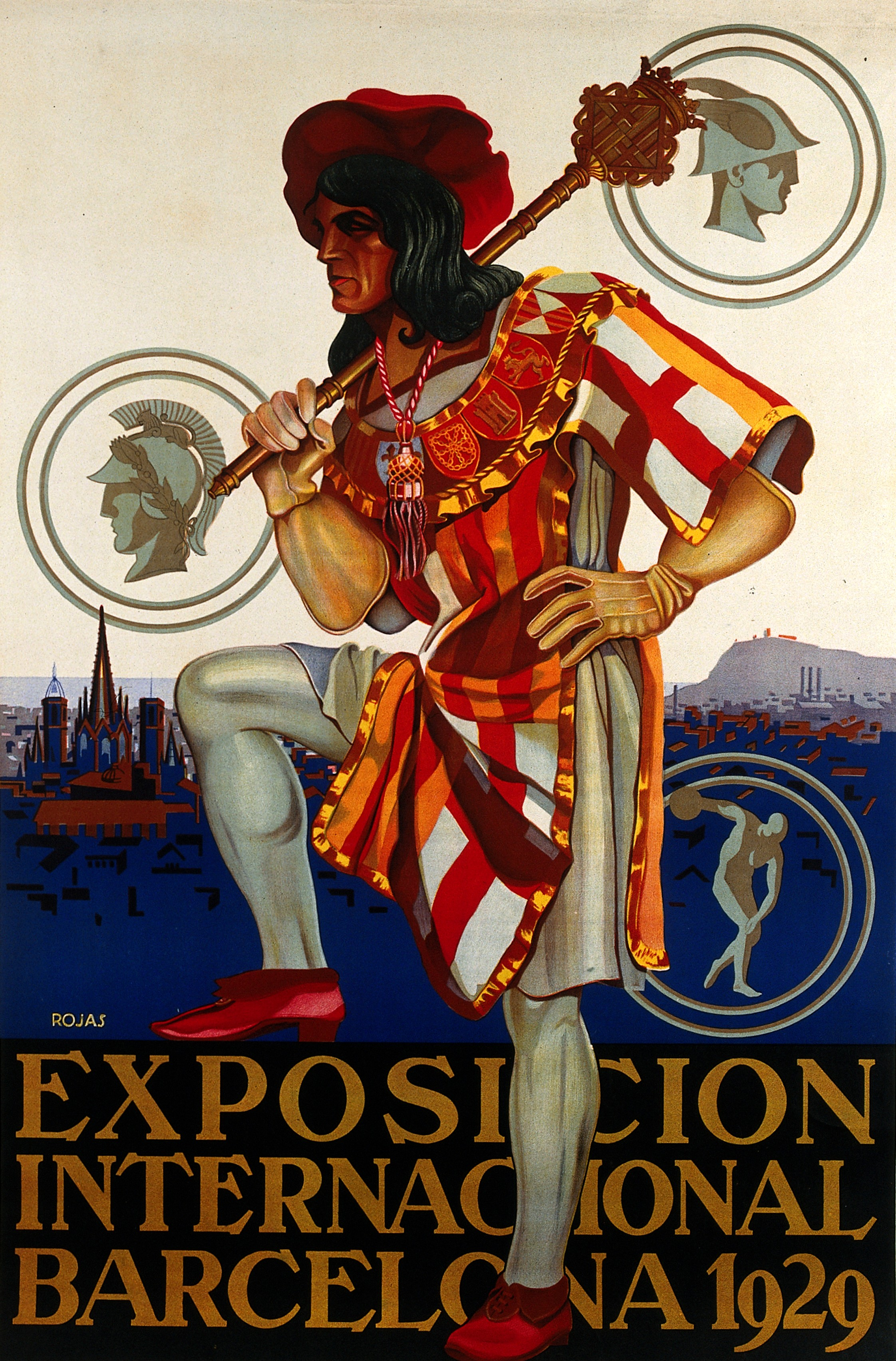
- Poster featuring a man wearing 16th century costume with the coats of arms of Spanish Kingdoms

Overview
- BIE-class: Universal exposition
- Category: Historical Expo
- Name: Exposición General d'España (section: Exposición Internacional de Barcelona)
- Area: 118 hectares (290 acres)

Participant(s)
- Countries: 20

Location
- Country: Spain
- City: Barcelona
- Venue: Montjuïc
- Coordinates: 41°22′14″N 2°09′00″E

Timeline
- Opening: 20 May 1929
- Closure: 30 January 1930

Universal expositions
- Previous: Panama–Pacific International Exposition in San Francisco
- Next: Century of Progress in Chicago

Simultaneous
- Universal: Ibero-American Exposition of 1929 in Sevilla

The 1929 Barcelona International Exposition (also 1929 Barcelona Universal Exposition, or Expo 1929, officially in Spanish: Exposición Internacional de Barcelona 1929) was the second World Fair to be held in Barcelona, the first one being in 1888. It took place from 20 May 1929 to 15 January 1930 in Barcelona, Spain. It was held on Montjuïc, the hill overlooking the harbor, southwest of the city center, and covered an area of 118 hectares (291.58 acres) at an estimated cost of 130 million pesetas ($25,083,921 in United States dollars). Twenty European nations participated in the fair, including Germany, Britain, Belgium, Denmark, France, Hungary, Italy, Norway, Romania and Switzerland. In addition, private organizations from the United States and Japan participated. Hispanic American countries as well as Brazil, Portugal and the United States were represented in the Ibero-American section in Sevilla.

The previous 1888 Barcelona Universal Exposition had led to a great advance in the city's economic, architectural and technological growth and development, including the reconstruction of the Parc de la Ciutadella, the city's main public park. A new exposition was proposed to highlight the city's further technological progress and increase awareness abroad of modern Catalan industry. This new exhibition required the urban planning of Montjuïc and its adjacent areas and the renovation of public spaces, principally Plaça d'Espanya.

The exposition called for a great deal of urban development within the city, and became a testing-ground for the new architectural styles developed in the early 20th century. At a local level, this meant the consolidation of Noucentisme, a classical style that replaced the Modernisme (in the same vein as Glasgow Style / Art Nouveau / Jugendstil, etc.) predominating in Catalonia at the turn of the 20th century. Furthermore, it marked the arrival in Spain of international avant-garde tendencies, especially rationalism, as seen in the design of the Barcelona Pavilion, created by German Bauhaus architect Ludwig Mies van der Rohe. The Exposition also allowed for the erection of several emblematic buildings and structures, including the Palau Nacional de Catalunya, the Font màgica de Montjuïc, the Teatre Grec, Poble Espanyol, and the Estadi Olímpic.

== Origin ==
The idea of a new exhibition began to take shape in 1905, promoted by the architect Josep Puig i Cadafalch, as a way of bringing out the new Plan of links designed by Léon Jaussely. It was initially proposed that the Exposition should be constructed in the area of the Besòs River, but instead, in 1913, planners selected Montjuïc as the site. While originally planned for 1917, the exposition was delayed due to World War I.

Puig i Cadafalch's project was supported by the Foment del Treball Nacional (National Labor Development), especially Francesc d'Assis, one of its leaders, who took charge of negotiations with the various agencies involved in the project. Thus, in 1913 the organization created a joint committee for organizing the event, consisting of representatives of the Foment and the City Council, be appointed commissioners of the organization Josep Puig i Cadafalch, Francesc Cambo and Joan Pitch i Pon.

In 1915, the committee presented a first draft by Puig i Cadafalch, which was divided into three specific projects, each commissioned to a team of architects. Puig i Cadafalch and Guillem Busquets reserved the area at the base of the mountain, Lluis Domenech i Montaner and Manuel Vega i March planned the area atop the mountain—designated the International Section, and Enric Sagnier and August Font i Carreras Miramar developed a Maritime Section.

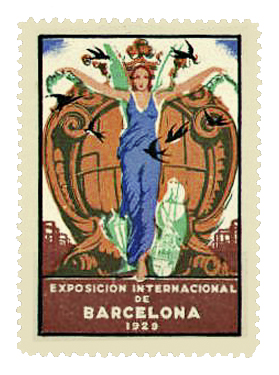
Promotional "Cinderella stamp" for the Barcelona International Exposition, 1929

The principal difficulty of the project was the amount of land required. The exposition would need at least 110 hectares, and the Barcelona City Council had only 26 by 1914. Thus, using an 1879 law, they resorted to land-expropriation. In 1917, development work began at Montjuïc, with assistant engineer Marià Rubio i Bellver. Landscaping was done by Jean-Claude Nicolas Forestier, who was assisted by Maria Rubio i Tudurí Nicolau. Their design was distinctly Mediterranean, with classical influences, combining the gardens with the construction of pergolas and terraces. Likewise, a funicular was built to allow access to the top of the mountain, as well as an aerial tram, which connected the mountain with the Port of Barcelona. However, the aerial tram did not open until 1931, after the fair was closed.

Construction, while somewhat delayed, was completed in 1923, but the introduction that year of the dictatorship of Primo de Rivera delayed the actual exposition, which finally occurred in 1929, coinciding with the Ibero-American Exhibition in Seville. Also, the delay made obsolete the goal of promoting electrical industry, so that in 1925 the event was renamed the International Exhibition in Barcelona. The change of objective led to the reorganization of the exhibition, so that it was devoted to three aspects: industry, the sports, and art. In this new period, the organization fell into the hands of Pere Domènech i Roura, the Marquis de Foronda, and Director of Works.

Further development of the event allowed for a great stylistic diversity in the buildings of various architects, some loyal to the Noucentisme prevailing at the time, others reflecting recurring historicist and eclectic trends that persisted since the late 19th century, with particular influence from the Spanish Baroque, in particular the architecture of Santiago de Compostela, in Galicia. Despite this diversity, most buildings—at least the official ones—had a common theme of monumentality and grandiosity. In contrast, buildings in the International Section, home to pavilions representing other countries and institutions, had a more contemporary aspect, parallel to the current state of the art of the period. This particularly included Art Deco and rationalism.

The exposition was opened by King Alfonso XIII on 19 May 1929. Led by Mayor Darius Rumeu y Freixa, baron de Viver, and Manuel de Álvarez-Cuevas y Olivella, member of the Organizing Committee. It was attended by some 200,000 people in the general public and by many Catalan political, economic, and cultural figures, including the Prime Minister (and dictator) Miguel Primo de Rivera.

In terms of cost, the exhibition lost money, with a deficit of 180 million pesetas. Its success was relative; during the event the stock market crashed in New York, on 29 October 1929, which reduced the number of participants in the event. At the social level, it was great success as it allowed for a large influx of people and achievements for the city of Barcelona, especially in the fields of architecture and urbanism.

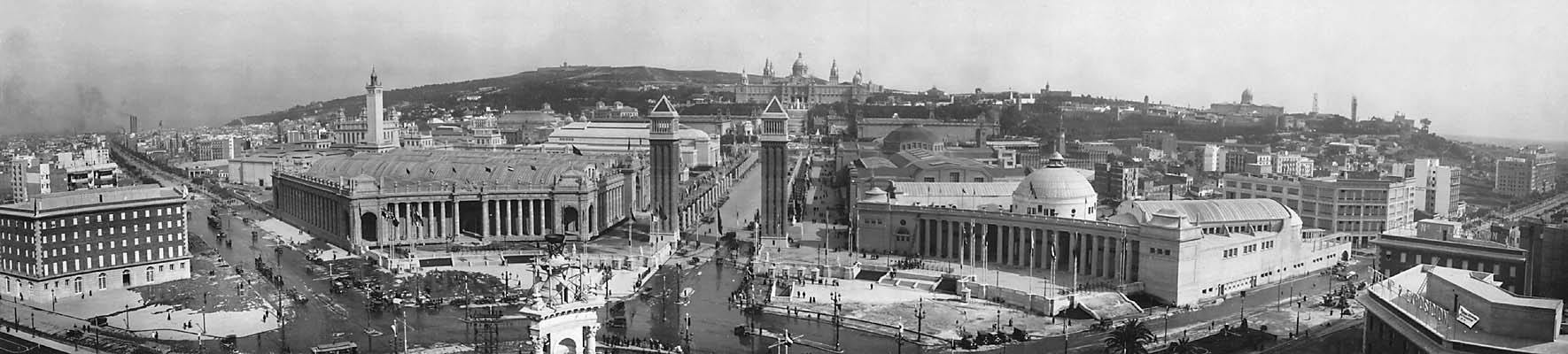
The Avenue of the Americas from Plaça d'Espanya

== Exposition Center ==
The Exposition Center, el recinte de l'Exposició, was built to designs by Puig i Cadafalch with two different types of buildings: palaces, the sections devoted to the official competition; and flags, representing countries, institutions and companies. The exposition's main axis began at the Plaça d'Espanya, where four large hotels were built, through the Avenue of Americas (now the Avinguda de la Reina Maria Cristina), which housed the grand buildings of the Exposition, to the foot of the mountain, the site of the "Magic Fountain", the Palaces Alfonso XIII and Victoria Eugenia, and a monumental staircase.

The Avenue of the Americas was decorated with numerous fountains, as well as glass columns—illuminated by electricity—designed by Charles Buïgas, which caused a great sensation. On both sides of the avenue were the main buildings of the Exposition: Palace of Costumes; the Palace of Communications and Transport; and the Palace of Metallurgy, Electricity and Locomotion. Today, these buildings are used as exposition spaces in the Barcelona Trade Fair. Along the avenue was Mechanics Square (now the Plaça de l'Univers), at the center of which stood the "Tower of Light", and the sculpture El Treball, by Josep Llimona.

=== Plaça d'Espanya ===
The Plaça d'Espanya was included in Ildefons Cerdà's plan for the expansion of Barcelona, the Eixample. It was to be a major point of communication in the route between Barcelona and the towns of Baix Llobregat. After a first draft by the urbanized square Josep Amargós in 1915, the square was finally built to plans by Josep Puig i Cadafalch and Guillem Busquets, and then finished by Antoni Darder i Marsa. It was fully complete by 1926. They designed the square as a monumental rotary, to be surrounded by a Baroque colonnade. The design was influenced by Bernini's St. Peter's Square in Rome. Dividing the square from the Avenue of the Americas Ramon Reventós designed two bell-towers, known as the Venetian Towers, which were heavily influenced by St. Mark's Campanile in Venice.

At the center of the square another monumental fountain was built, designed by Josep Maria Jujol. Its ornate decoration is an allegory of Spain, surrounded by water. Three niches with sculptures symbolize the three principal rivers of the Iberian Peninsula, the Ebro, Guadalquivir, and Tagus. Around the central sculpture, three decorated columns symbolize Religion (a cross with Ramon Llull, Saint Teresa of Jesus, and Saint Ignatius of Loyola), Heroism (a sword with Pelagius of Asturias, James I and Isabella), and Arts ( a book with Ausias March and Miguel de Cervantes).

=== The Magic Fountain ===
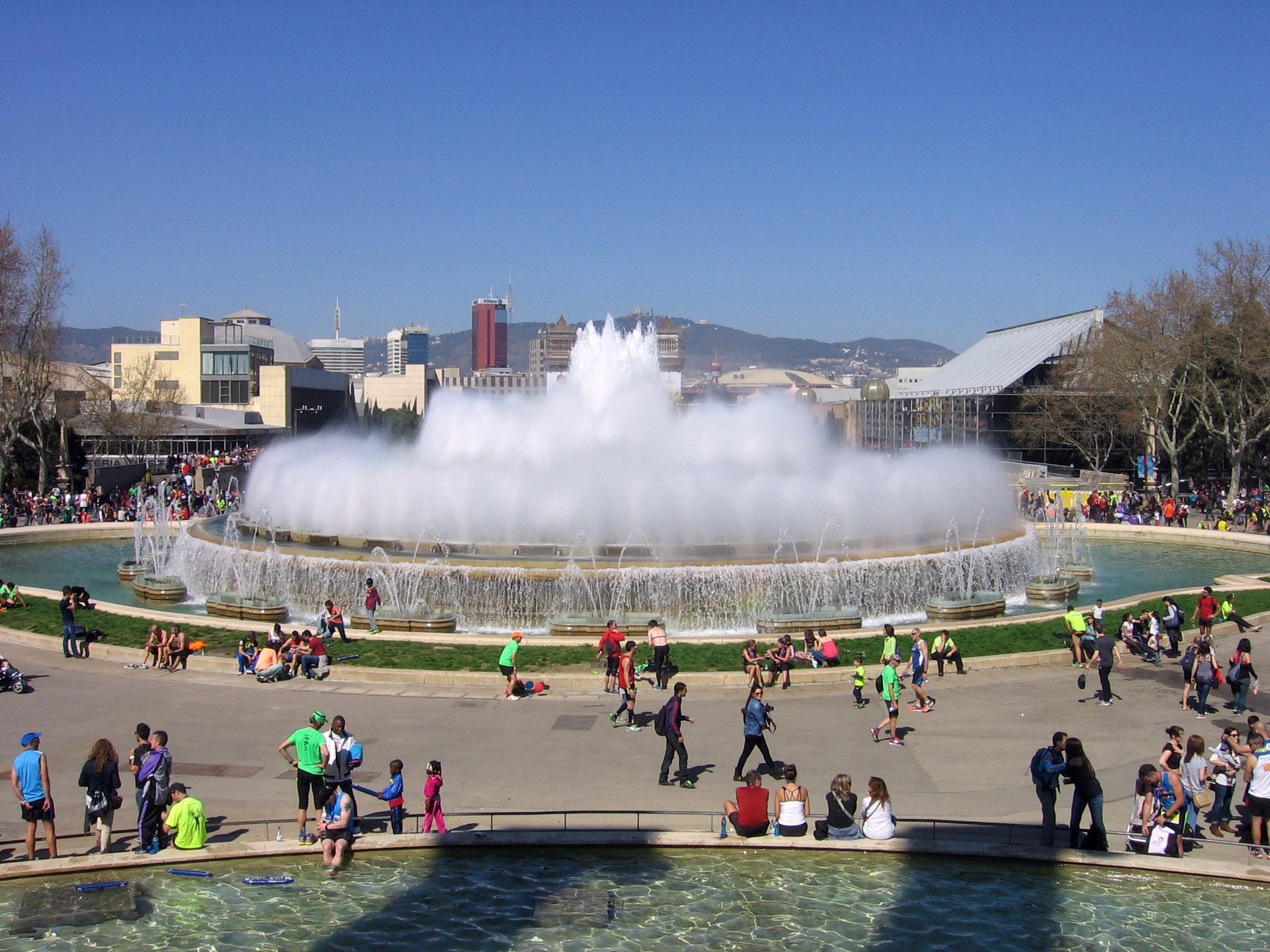
The Magic Fountain in 2014

The famous Magic Fountain of Montjuïc, designed by Carles Buïgas, was constructed in 1929 on Avinguda Maria Cristina at the foot of Montjuic, and amazed the public with its light and water displays. Today, it is still an emblem of the Catalan capital, and musical lightshows are often performed there during the annual festival of La Mercè, as well as during every weekend. It enchants the public with a backdrop of the Museu Nacional d'Art de Catalunya. Originally, four columns were built in this location by Puig i Cadafalch to represent the Catalan flag, but these were removed by Spanish dictator Primo de Rivera's orders.

=== Official Sections ===
- The Communications and Transport Centre: Designed by Félix de Azúa and Adolf Florensa in 1926, it was built in a neoclassical style inspired by the architecture of the French academy. It was one of the largest buildings of the Exposition, with an area of 16,000 m^{2}. With entrances onto the Plaza de España and Avenida de la Reina María Cristina, its structure is organised around a floor projecting out onto Plaza de España and supported by columns. The Avenida's façade is in the form of a triumphal arch, finished off with a group of sculptures including the figure of a Victoria. It is currently part of the Barcelona Trade Fair.
- The Clothing Centre (or Labour Centre): initially named the Centre of Pedagogy, Hygiene and Social Institutions, it was designed by Josep Maria Jujol and Andrés Calzada, and is located between the Plaza de España and the Avenida de la Reina María Cristina. With an area of 6,500 m^{2}, like the Communications and Transport Centre its structure had to be adapted to an elevated room supported on columns over the Plaza de España, with an irregularly shaped floor arrayed around a central space, with a large rotunda topped by an eastern-style dome. This building is also part of the Barcelona Trade Fair.
- The Centre for Metallurgy, Electricity and Motive Force: the work of Amadeu Llopart and Alexandre Soler i March, this building has an area of 16,000 m^{2}. From its rectangular plan, a large polyhedral dome rises from its centre, with a lantern but no drum, possibly inspired by Bruno Taut's glass pavilion, built for the Deutscher Werkbund in Cologne. The façade is notable for its large classical pediment, decorated by Francesc d'Assís Galí's frescoes (he also painted the entrance hall's soffits, together with Josep Obiols and Manuel Humbert). To either side of the building are large towers with allegorical sculptures by Enric Casanovas. This building is also part of the Barcelona Trade Fair.
- The Centre for Textile Arts: designed by Joan Roig and Emili Canosa, this was situated between the Communications and Transport Centre and the Projection Centre, with its entrance on the Plaza del Universo. With an area of 20,000 m^{2}, it was dedicated to the textile industry, with booths for Spanish, German, Austrian, French, Italian and Swiss companies. The central body of the building is in renaissance style, while the taller façade was neoclassical, with a balustrade castellated in the Plateresque style and two domed towers. Its interior housed an exhibition on silk, promoted by Germany and designed by Ludwig Mies van der Rohe and interior designer Lilly Reich, the first example of the German architect's creative genius. He conceived a well-lit, open space, neoplasticist in structure, where a skilled use of space achieved a feeling of open space throughout the room. The 50th Anniversary Centre, belonging to the Barcelona Trade Fair, was built in its place.
- The Projection Centre: designed by Eusebi Bona and Francisco Aznar, this building is situated between the Avenida de la Reina María Cristina, the Avenida Rius i Taulet and the Plaza del Universo. With an area of 10.000 m^{2}, it had two floors, the first with a large showroom, with a stage and projection room, and various exhibition rooms. The building's façade is notable, in the classical, monumental style, decorated with sculptures by Joan Pueyo: four groups of caryatids with bisons, four groups of sphinxes and two fountains, carved in artificial stone. Removed after the Exposition, the current Convention Centre was built in its place. Next to this building were the Exposition's offices, now a college (CEIP Jacint Verdaguer), designed by Juan Bruguera.
- The Alfonso XIII and Victoria Eugenia Centres: originally named the Centres for Modern Art and Architecture, they were designed by Josep Puig i Cadafalch y Guillem Busquets, symmetrically located next to the Magic Fountain, at the foot of the Palau Nacional. These were the first buildings to be constructed, completed in 1923, when they housed the a Furniture and Interior Decoration Exposition as a trial run for the later event. Each had a surface area of 14,000 m^{2}, rectangular floors formed by quadrangular modules, and a set of four towers for each building, topped by pinnacles in the shape of pyramids and decorated with sgraffito, representing Solomonic columns and plant motifs. The Alfonso XIII Centre was dedicated to Construction, while the Victoria Eugenia housed the representatives of countries without their own pavilions. It is currently part of the Barcelona Trade Fair.
- The Palau Nacional: the main building of the Exposition, this was designed by Eugenio Cendoya and Enric Catà, under the supervision of Pere Domènech i Roura, after Puig i Cadafalch and Guillem Busquets' initial plan was rejected. Built between 1926 and 1929, it has an area of 32,000 m^{2}. Its classical style was inspired by the Spanish Renaissance, and its floors are rectangular with two lateral sections and a square section behind, with a large elliptical dome in the central part. The cascades and jets of the Palace's staircase were also designed by Carles Buïgas, and nine large projectors were placed which to this day still send out intense beams of light which write the city's name in the sky. The inauguration ceremony was held in its Oval Hall, presided over by Alfonso XIII and Queen Victoria Eugenia. The Palau Nacional was dedicated to an exhibition of Spanish art with more than 5,000 works from throughout Spanish territory. Various artists were involved in its decoration—in Novecento style, in contrast to the classical architecture—such as the sculptors Enric Casanovas, Josep Dunyach, Frederic Marès and Josep Llimona, and painters Francesc d'Assís Galí, Josep de Togores, Manuel Humbert, Josep Obiols, Joan Colom and Francesc Labarta. As of 1934, it has housed the Museu Nacional d'Art de Catalunya.
- The City of Barcelona Pavilion: a work designed by architect Josep Goday in the noucentist style. It hosted an exhibition about past, present and future of the host city. Located between the Plaza de los Bellos Oficios (today Plaça de Carles Buïgas), the Avenida de la Técnica (currently Carrer de la Guàrdia Urbana), the Avenida Rius i Taulet and the Alfonso XIII Centre, it covered an area of 2,115 m^{2}. It is a brick and Montjuic stone building. Its façade is decorated with several sculptures, allegories of Barcelona and its history, carved by sculptors Frederic Marès, Eusebi Arnau and Pere Jou. It is currently the Guàrdia Urbana de Barcelona headquarters.
- The Press Centre: dedicated to the magazines and daily papers printed in Barcelona at that time, this building was designed by Pere Domènech i Roura. Located on Avenida Rius i Taulet, it currently houses the Guardia Urbana de Barcelona. With an area of 600 m^{2}, it has a basement and three floors, with several styles mixed in a historic concept: neo-Mudéjar, neo-Romanesque, neo-Gothic, etc. Domènech used various modernist elements, such as facebrick, iron and ceramics, being influenced by his father, Lluís Domènech i Montaner.
- The Centre for Decorative and Applied Arts: located between calle Lérida and the Avenida de la Técnica, this building was designed by Manuel Casas and Manuel Puig and had an area of 12,000 m^{2}. The building was organised around a central patio, covered by a rectangular glass structure; the rest of the building was in a French baroque style, with a monumental appearance. The façade displayed a set of receding and protruding shapes, from which two large towers topped with domes and lanterns stood out. In 1955, the Palau dels Esports de Barcelona (now the Barcelona Teatre Musical) was built in its place.
- The Graphical Arts Centre: located on the Paseo de Santa Madrona, this was designed by Raimon Duran i Reynals and Pelai Martínez, in a Noucentist style influenced by the Italian Renaissance, particularly Filippo Brunelleschi, Donato Bramante and Andrea Palladio. With an area of 4,000 m^{2}, it was dedicated to the graphical arts, particularly book printing. Entrance was via a staircase and two lateral ramps for vehicles, with a façade formed by arcaded galleries, with pavilions to the sides and a central drum over which a dome is elevated. Once again, the German exhibition designed by Mies van der Rohe and Lilly Reich stood out, composed of glass cabinets in geometric shapes. Since 1935 it has housed the Archeological Museum of Catalonia.
- The Centre of Agriculture: designed by Josep Maria Ribas i Casas and Manuel Maria Mayol, it is located between Paseo de Santa Madrona and calle Lérida. With an area of 16,000 m^{2}, it is arranged around a central patio, with five rectangular naves and two arcaded galleries. Influenced by the Italian Renaissance—particularly by Lombardy—the façades of the various façades are covered by stucco and ceramics, with several octagonal towers and triple arches. It is now known as the "Mercat de les Flors" (Market of the Flowers) and is occupied by the Theatre City, which includes the Theatre Institute, the Teatre Lliure Foundation, the Mercat de les Flors Municipal Theatre and the Fabià Puigserver Theatre.
- The Spanish Pavilion: designed by Antoni Darder, with an area of 4,500 m^{2}, was designed for representatives from the Government and ministries. It consists of a central body and two symmetrical wings, with towers at each end. It was inspired by the Plateresque style, with semicircular arches and Corinthian columns. It was demolished after the Exposition.
- The Delegation Centre: designed by Enric Sagnier i Villavecchia, it is located between the Avenida del Marqués de Comillas and the Avenida de Montanyans, opposite the Plaza de la Hidráulica (now the Plaza de Sant Jordi; the fountain of Ceres and an equestrian statue of Saint George by Josep Llimona were located here). With an area of 2,350 m^{2}, it was dedicated to the representatives of provincial Spanish delegations. Designed in a Gothic-Plateresque style, the main façade was concave, with a central tower and two symmetrical wings with crenellated arches and towers at their extremes. The Royal shield and the shields of Catalonia, León and Barcelona were displayed on the façade.
- The Chemistry Centre: designed by Antoni Sardà, this building was designed to display sports-related material, but at the last moment its function was changed in order to dedicated it to the chemical industry. With an area of 4,500 m^{2}, it was located in the Avenida de Montanyans, next to the Delegation Centre. Classically styled, the main façade was divided into three sections, the central section having a colonnaded entrance and a ribbed dome over a decagonal drum. From 1932 to 1962, when it was destroyed in a fire, it was the seat of Orphea Cinematographic Studios.
- The Royal Pavilion: now known as Albéniz Palace, it housed the representatives of the Spanish Royal House. Located close to the Stadium, surrounded by spacious gardens, it was designed by Juan Moya in a baroque style inspired by the 18th-century French courts. The interior decoration is in the Empire style, most notably the tapestries designed by Francisco Goya and a room of mirrors copied from Versailles. Extended in 1970 and decorated by Salvador Dalí paintings, it is currently used in certain ceremonies and public acts.
- The Centre for Modern Art: designed by Antoni Darder in 1927, it had an area of 5,000 m^{2} and is located between the Royal Pavilion and the Centre of Missions. It formed part of the "Art in Spain" section, containing collections of paintings, sculpture, drawings and engravings from the 19th century. Rectangular in plan, its main façade had a central body and two symmetrical wings, with a central structure in the form of semicircular arches resembling the work of the Italian architect Filippo Juvara.
- The Centre of Missions: designed by Antoni Darder, it had area of 5,000 m^{2}, dedicated to displaying the work of missionary institutions. The main façade was inspired by Romanesque churches, with semicircular arches built with semicircular arches with voussoirs, long, narrow windows and pentagonal tops. The building was rectangular in plan, with an octagonal dome inspired by the Italian Renaissance.
- The Southern Palace: designed by Antoni Millàs, it was located in the Avenida Internacional (now the Avenida del Estadio). With an area of 26,000 m^{2}, it was rectangular in plan, with three naves covered by square modules with skylight-style openings. It was located in a place initially planned to hold an aviation field, which was never built.

=== International Section ===
Participating countries
Austria	Belgium	Czechoslovakia	Denmark
Finland	France	Germany	Hungary
Italy	Japan	Netherlands	Norway
Portugal	Romania	Spain	Sweden
Switzerland	United Kingdom	United States	Yugoslavia

As the Ibero-American Exposition of 1929 was taking place simultaneously in Seville, no Spanish American countries participated. From the remaining countries, the official participants were Austria, Belgium, Czechoslovakia, Denmark, Finland, France, Germany, Hungary, Italy, Norway, Romania, Sweden, Switzerland and the State of Slovenes, Croats and Serbs (later Yugoslavia); most of these countries had their own pavilions, except for Austria, Czechoslovakia, Finland and Switzerland. Apart from these countries, Japan, the Netherlands, Portugal, the United Kingdom and the United States participated in an unofficial capacity. Each country had a week dedicated to it throughout the course of the event, with a highlight of the German week being the flight of the Graf Zeppelin airship over Barcelona, on 16 May 1929.

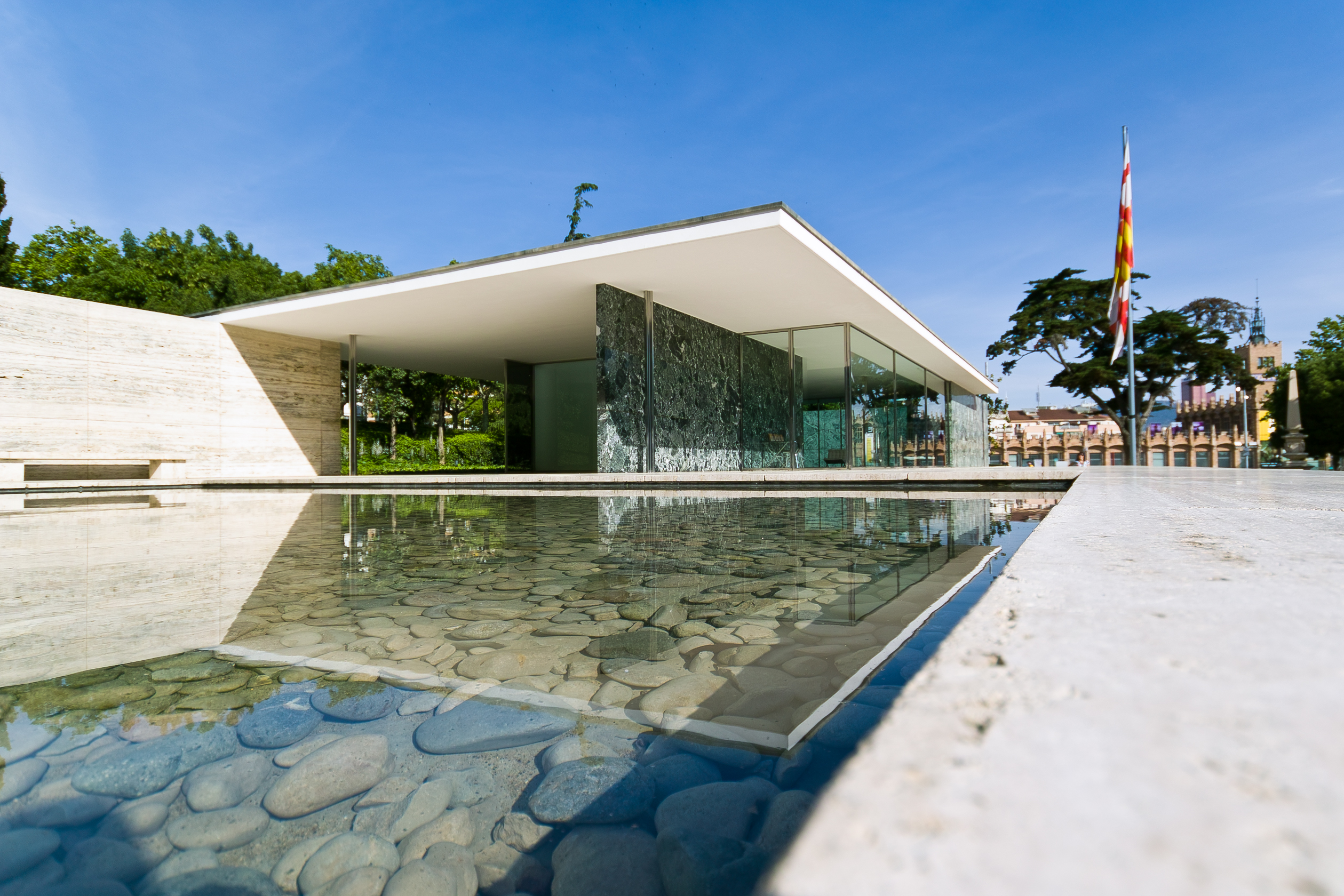
A 1986 reconstruction of the German Pavilion.

- German Pavilion: one of the masterpieces by Mies van der Rohe, it is one of the best examples of the international style of architecture due to its purity of form, its spatial concept and its intelligent use of structures and materials, which turned this pavilion into the quintessential piece of 20th-century architecture. In 1928 Mies was contracted to build the official German pavilion together with the Electricity Supply pavilion and several exhibits in the Official Section's buildings, with the collaboration of interior designer Lilly Reich. Rectangular in shape, it is elevated on a travertine-covered podium; the covering was supported on cross-shaped columns and load-bearing walls, with side walls of different materials (plaster-covered bricks, steel covered by green marble and Moroccan onyx). Its decoration was reduced to two ponds and a sculpture, La Mañana, by Georg Kolbe. Demolished after the Exhibition, it was reconstructed between 1985 and 1987 in its original location by Cristian Cirici, Ignasi de Solà-Morales and Fernando Ramos, following Mies van der Rohe's plans.
- Belgian Pavilion: designed by the architect Verhelle, this was next to the Spanish Pavilion. Rectangular in shape, it was inspired by the Hof von Busleyden in Mechelen, built when Margaret of Austria established the court there, notable for a watchtower twice the height of the building.
- Danish Pavilion: designed by Tyge Hvass, this was a dihedron of reddish wood with a gabled roof, evoking a typical Danish mountain house. The façade showed an embossed Danish flag, anchor, wheat sheaf and cog wheel, typical elements of the Danish economy.
- French Pavilion: designed by Georges Wybo, in a classical style with art deco elements, this was located next to the Alfonso XIII centre. It was a single-volume building in the shape of a cube, with its roof formed by superimposed stepped rectangular sections, like a ziggurat, with a sculpture at the front in the shape of a woman and the initials R. F. (République Française).
- Hungarian Pavilion: designed by Dénes György and Nikolaus Menyhért, this was made up of two rectangular sections, with a tower over it in the shape of a prism. An example of expressionist architecture, the geometrical synthesis of its structure evoked the architecture of the Pre-Columbian era.
- Italian Pavilion: designed by Piero Portaluppi, this was located between the Spanish and Swedish pavilions. It had a surface area of 4,500 m^{2}, in the shape of a U, a renaissance classical style and a monumental atmosphere. The façade had some columns with the eagle of the Roman Empire, a frieze with the country's name and a fronton finished off with a statue of Minerva.
- Norwegian Pavilion: designed by Ole Lind Schistad, this was wooden like the Danish pavilion, with a similar likeness to mountain buildings, with shuttered windows and a sloped roof.
- Serbian, Croatian and Slovene Pavilion: the country which before the end of the fair would be renamed as Yugoslavia, this was designed by the architect Dragiša Brašovan and located next to the Palau Nacional. Avant-garde in conception, it was a star-shaped building with the façade made from wooden strips arranged in horizontal black and white stripes.
- Romanian Pavilion: designed by Duiliu Marcu, this was a rectangular building with a tower to one side and a gabled roof, panelled with wood and stucco. The façade had a series of arches ending in a pergola, with architectural elements characteristic of Transylvania.
- Swedish Pavilion: designed by Peder Clason, as with the other Scandinavian buildings it was built of wood, rectangular and with a geometric structure within the avant-garde currents of the time, such as neoplasticism. Next to the entrance door was a conical wooden tower, topped with three superimposed horizontal discs; it was named "Funkis", Swedish abbreviation for functionalism at the beginning of the 20th century. Both the building and the tower were dismantled after the Exhibition and reconstructed in Berga, where the pavilion served as a school up until the Spanish Civil War when the building was demolished at the beginning of the 1960s. There is currently a project to rebuild the tower next to the Olympic Museum, near its original location.
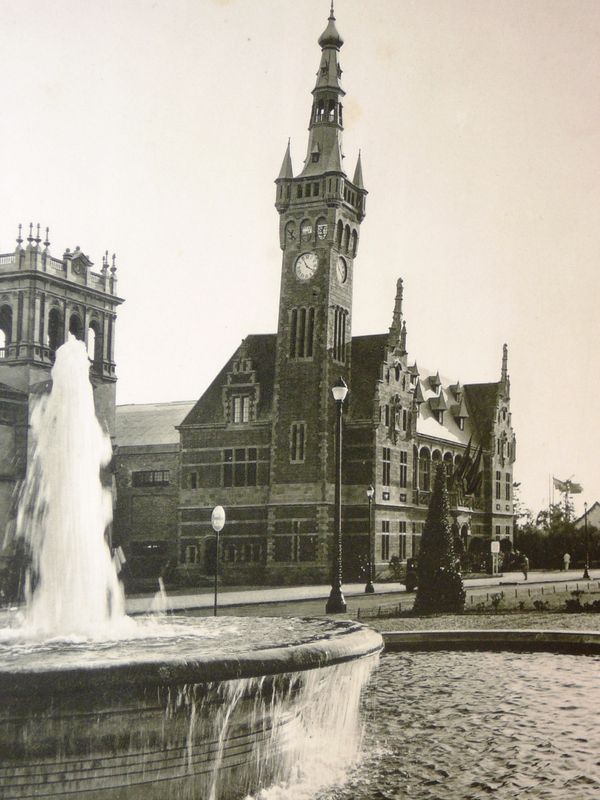
Belgian Pavilion.

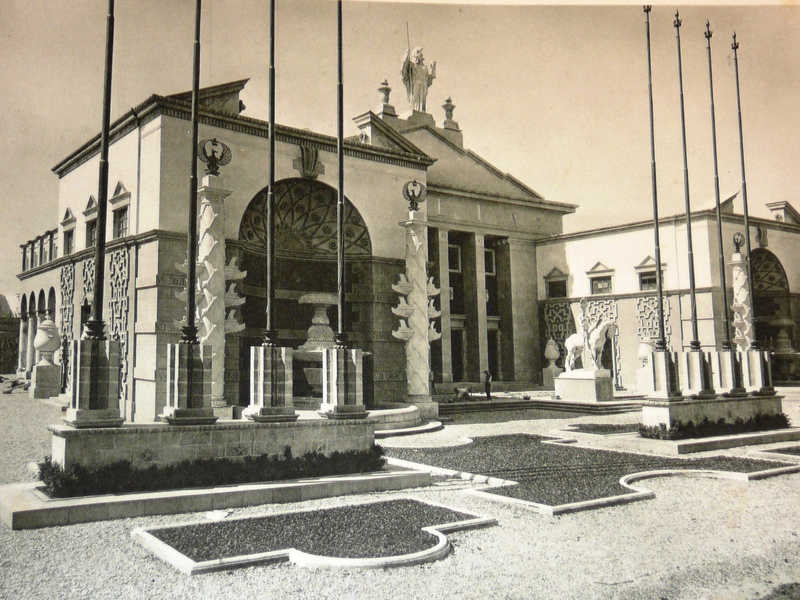
Italian Pavilion.

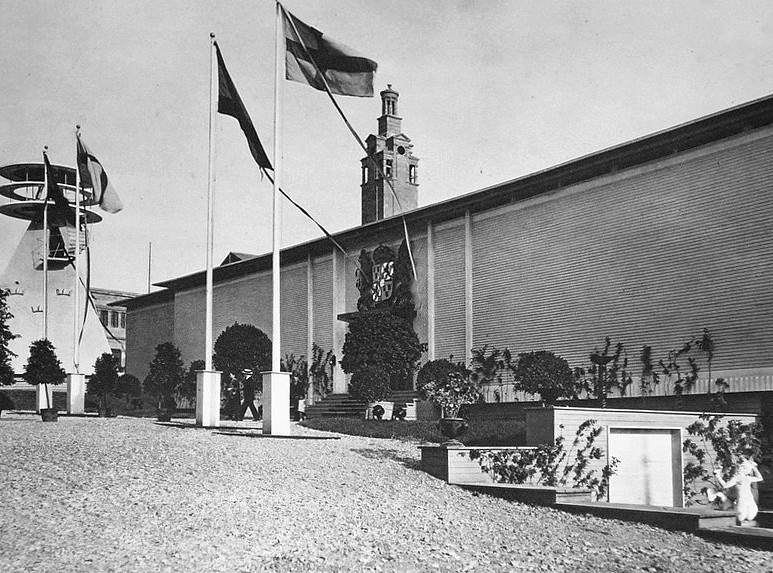
Swedish Pavilion.

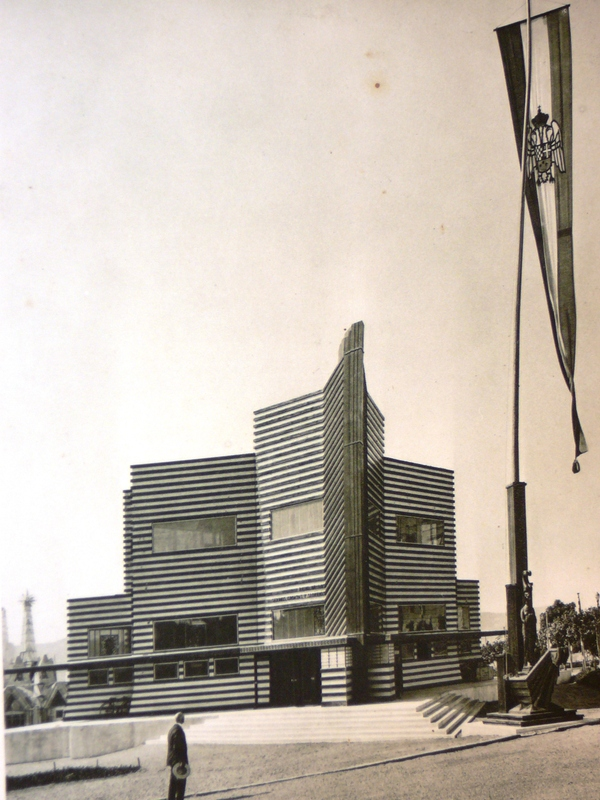
Serbian, Croat and Slovene Pavilion.

=== Private pavilions ===
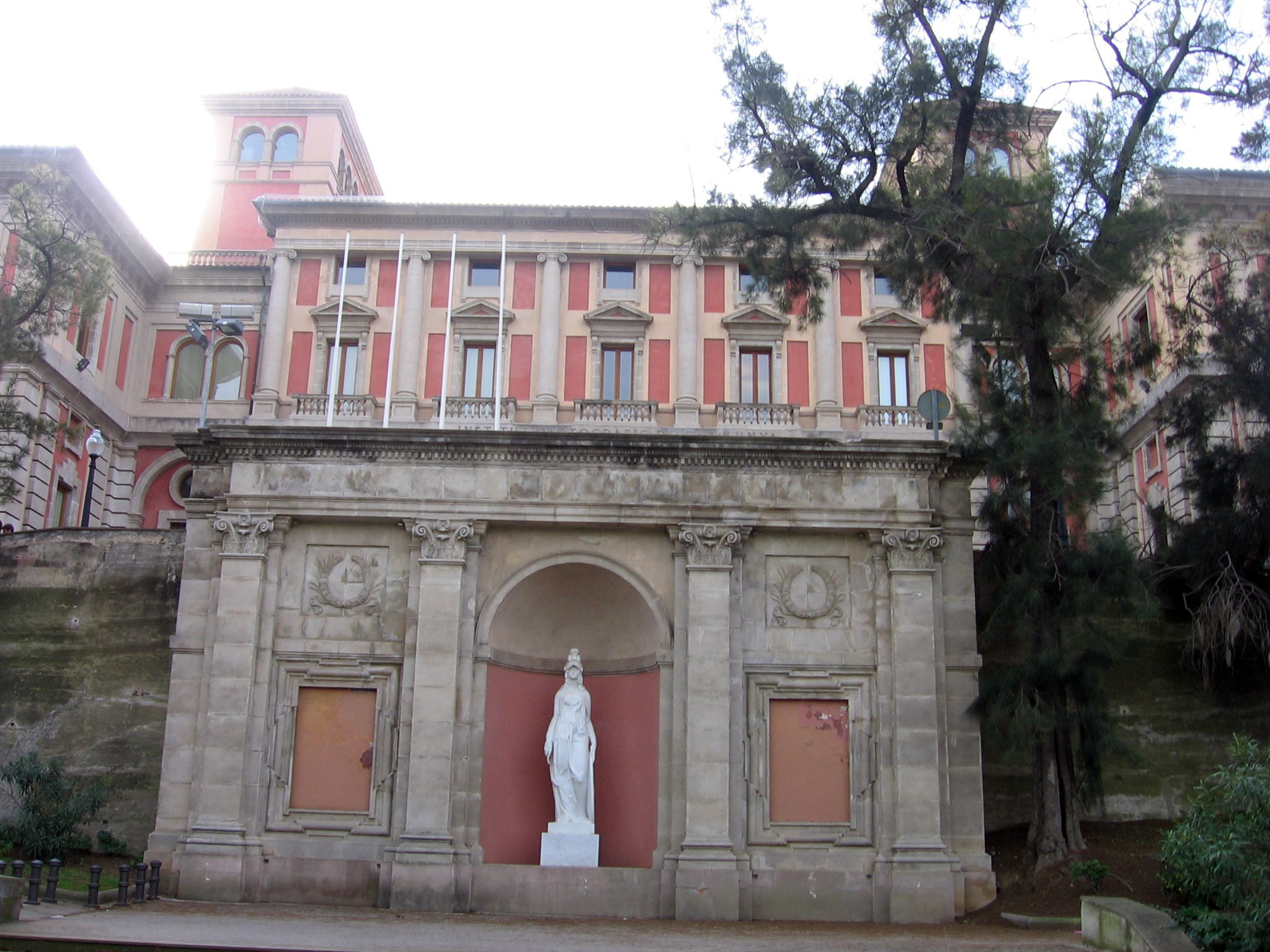
Pavilion of the Barcelona Bank Savings and Pensions.

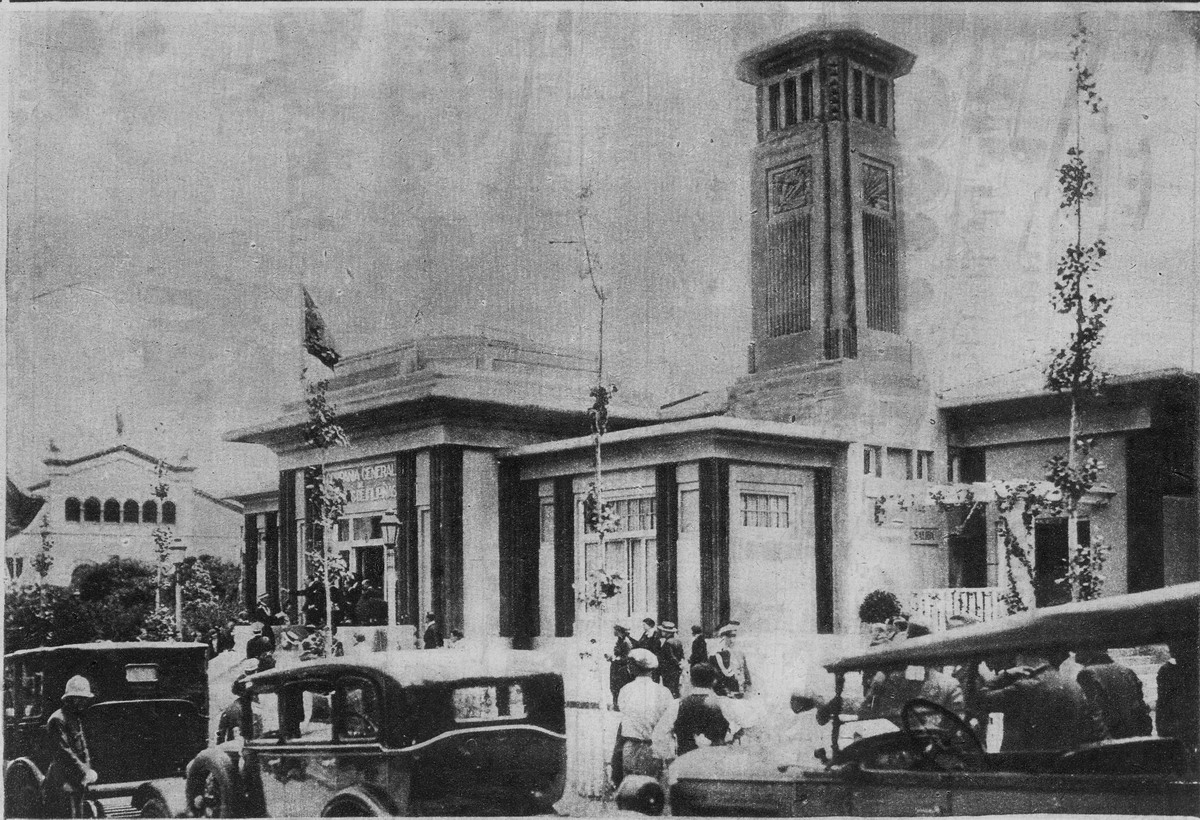
Pavilion of the Compañía General de Tabacos de Filipinas.

- Pavilion of the Barcelona Bank Savings and Pensions: located on Paseo de Santa Madrona, this was designed by Josep Maria Ribas i Casas and Manuel Maria Mayol. Eclectic in style, it presents structural solutions based on various different styles: the central section was inspired by Spanish palacial architecture of the 18th century, while the lateral parts are based on civil architecture of northern Italy and the loggias are reminiscent of 19th century tastes in Mediterranean villas. Because of its raised location, terraces with illuminated fountains were located at its entrance. Since 1982 it has been the headquarters of the Cartographic Institute of Catalonia.
- Pavilion of the Compañía General de Tabacos de Filipinas: located on Paseo de Santa Madrona, it was designed by Antoni Darder and constructed in 1928. The building is U-shaped, surrounded by gardens, and has a tower to one side and an octagonal dome over its central section. Darder followed the "art deco" style which was popular in the 1920s, with an intelligent distribution of internal space and a playful use of exterior volume. In 1932 it became the Forestier Municipal Kindergarten.
- German Electricity Supply Pavilion (Electric Supplies Co.): designed by Ludwig Mies van der Rohe and Lilly Reich, it was located in Plaza de la Luz, between the Communications and Transport Centre and the Centre for Textile Arts. The company Electric Supplies Co. was in charge of supplying electricity for the entire Exhibition grounds. A rectangular single-volume building, similar to an industrial ship, it went almost unnoticed during the event, being one of Mies' least well-regarded works and one of the last in which he used brick walls, passing on to using glass from then on.
- Can Jorba: the commercial company Jorba was presented in Can ("house of" in Catalan) Jorba, a small structure in the shape of the Eiffel Tower with the initials of the sponsoring brand built in: the J at the top and the A at the base of the tower.
- Pavilion of the Hydrographic Confederation of Ebro: designed by Regino Borobio, this was one of the few Spanish buildings in an avant-garde style, being a building in the shape of a horizontal box with a tall signal tower.
- Pavilion of the Hispano-Suiza Company: designed by Eusebi Bona, it was located in the viewpoint opposite the Palau Nacional.
- Artists' Gathering Pavilion: designed by Jaume Mestres i Fossas, its objective was to present the works of various Catalan artists who were not represented in the official section, for which reason it coexisted in private form. The building, in an art deco style, was octagonal with a stepped dome, while the interior distribution of space and decoration were rationalist in style, one of the few national examples of avant-garde type. Participating artists included Pablo Gargallo, Josep Granyer, Josep Llorens i Artigas, Lluís Mercadé, Josep de Togores, Josep Obiols, Miquel Soldevila, Jaume Mercadé, etc., displaying paintings, sculpture, ceramics, furniture, jewellery, enamel, woven rugs and other works of art, most of which fell within the sphere of art deco.

== Other buildings ==
=== Teatre Grec ===
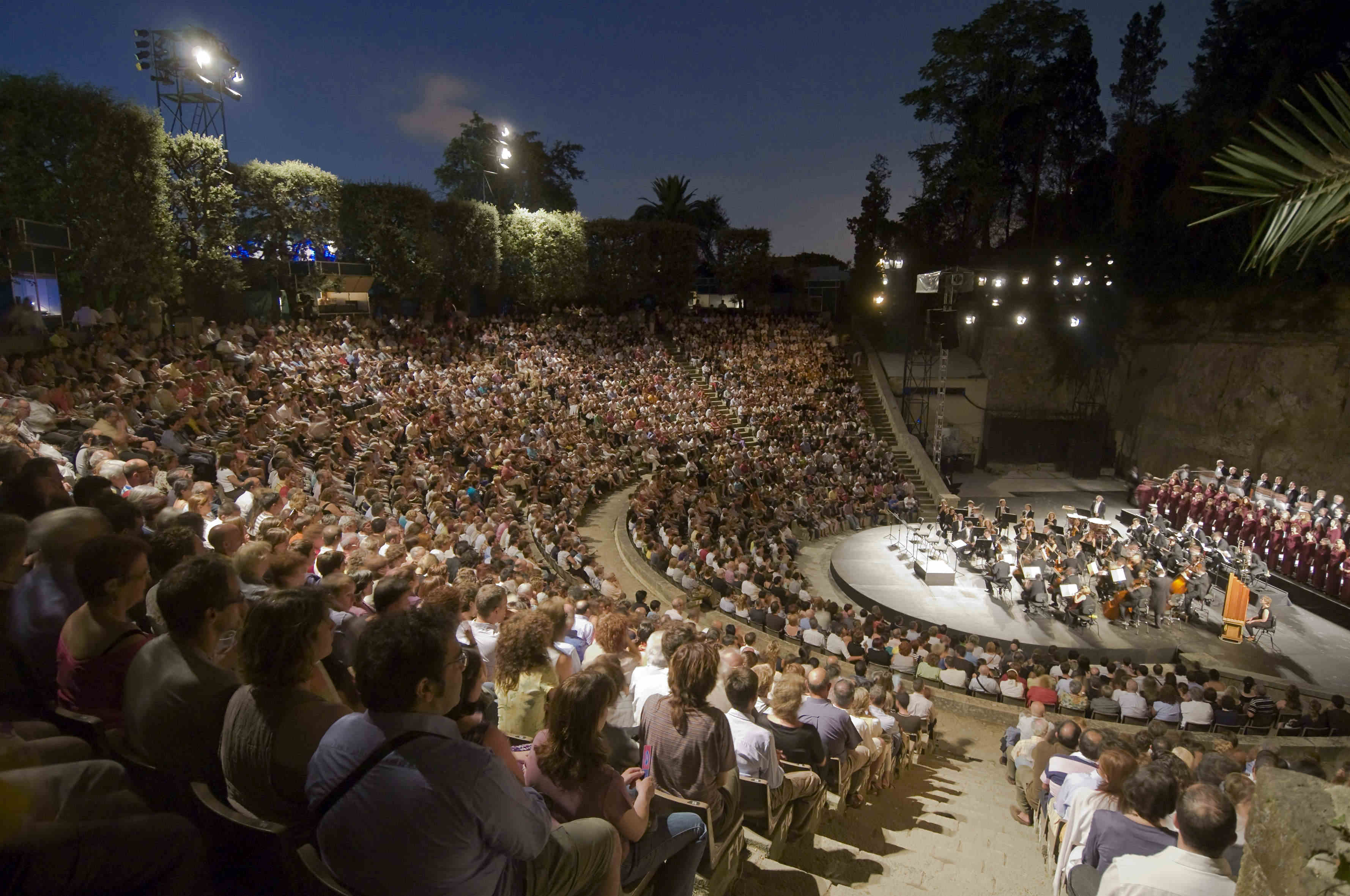
Teatre Grec.

The landscaping of Montjuic mountain left works like the Teatre Grec, an open-air theatre inspired by ancient Greek theatres (particularly the Epidaurus), designed by Ramon Reventós. Located in the site of an old quarry, it has a 460 m^{2} semicircular area, with a diameter of 70 m and a 2,000 person capacity. It is currently the site of a summer festival in Barcelona, the Festival Grec.

The theatre is situated within Laribal Gardens, designed by Forestier and Rubió, where the famous "Cat Fountain" is located at the entrance to a building by Puig i Cadafalch which has been convertred into a restaurant (1925). There are many sculptures in the gardens, with works by Josep Viladomat, Enric Casanovas, Josep Clarà, Pablo Gargallo, Antoni Alsina, Joan Rebull, Josep Dunyach, etc. In the Miramar zone the Montjuic swimming pool was built, as well as a restaurant which in 1959 became the first Televisión Española studios in Barcelona.

=== Estadi Olímpic ===
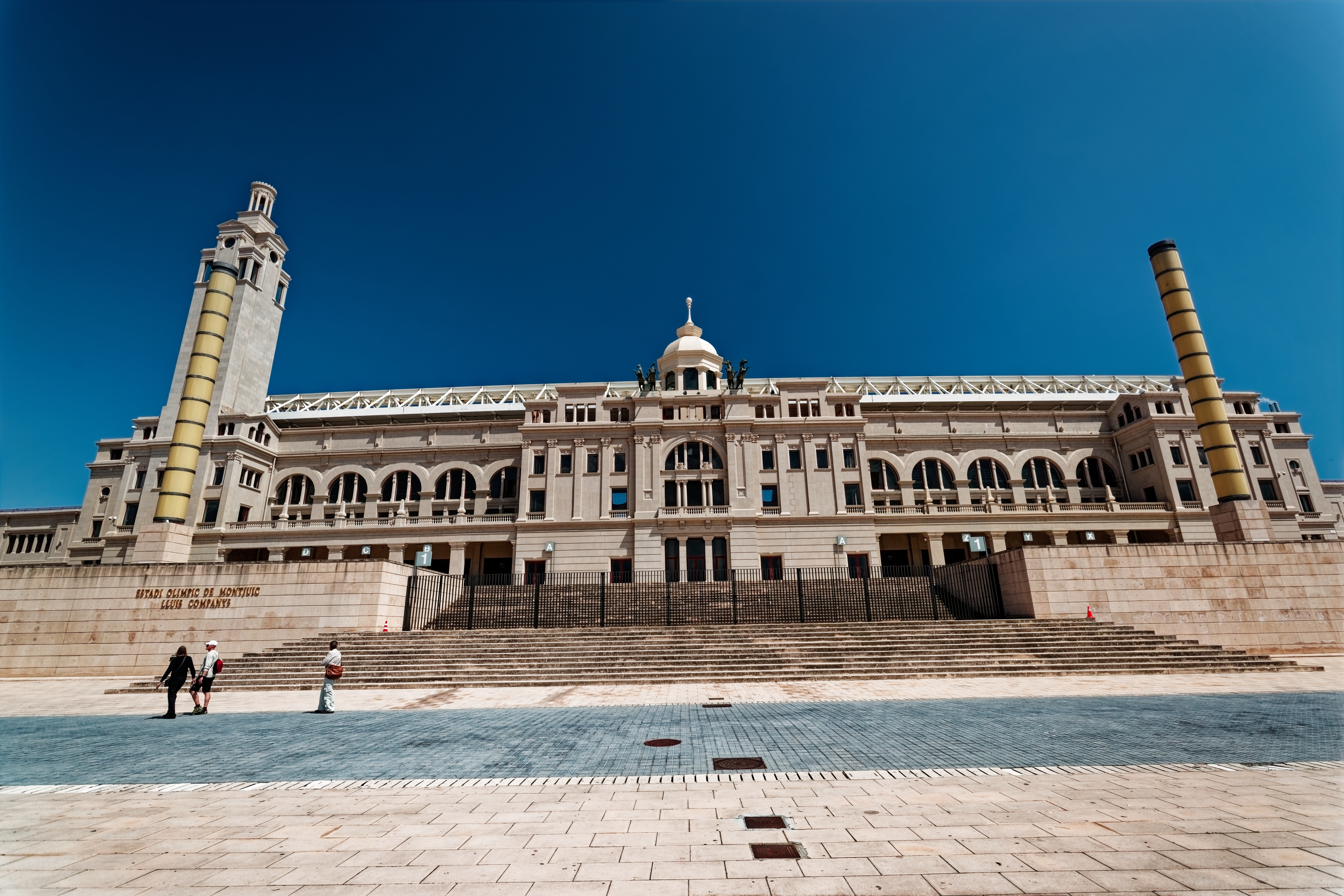
Olympic Stadium.

At the top of the hill, next to the International Section, the Olympic Stadium was built by Pere Domènech i Roura within the sports section. It had a surface area of 66,075 m^{2} and a 62,000 person capacity, making it the second biggest stadium in Europe at the time, after Wembley. It contained fields for the practice of football and other sports, as well as athletics tracks and installations for various other sports such as boxing, gymnastics and fencing, as well as tennis courts and a swimming pool. The main façade was monumental in atmosphere, with a dome and a tall tower topped with a shrine. It was decorated with sculptures, most notably the "Horse riders making the Olympic salute", two bronze equestrian sculptures by Pablo Gargallo. The building was remodelled by the architects Vittorio Gregotti, Frederic de Correa, Alfons Milà, Joan Margarit and Carles Buxadé for the 1992 Summer Olympics.

=== Poble Espanyol ===
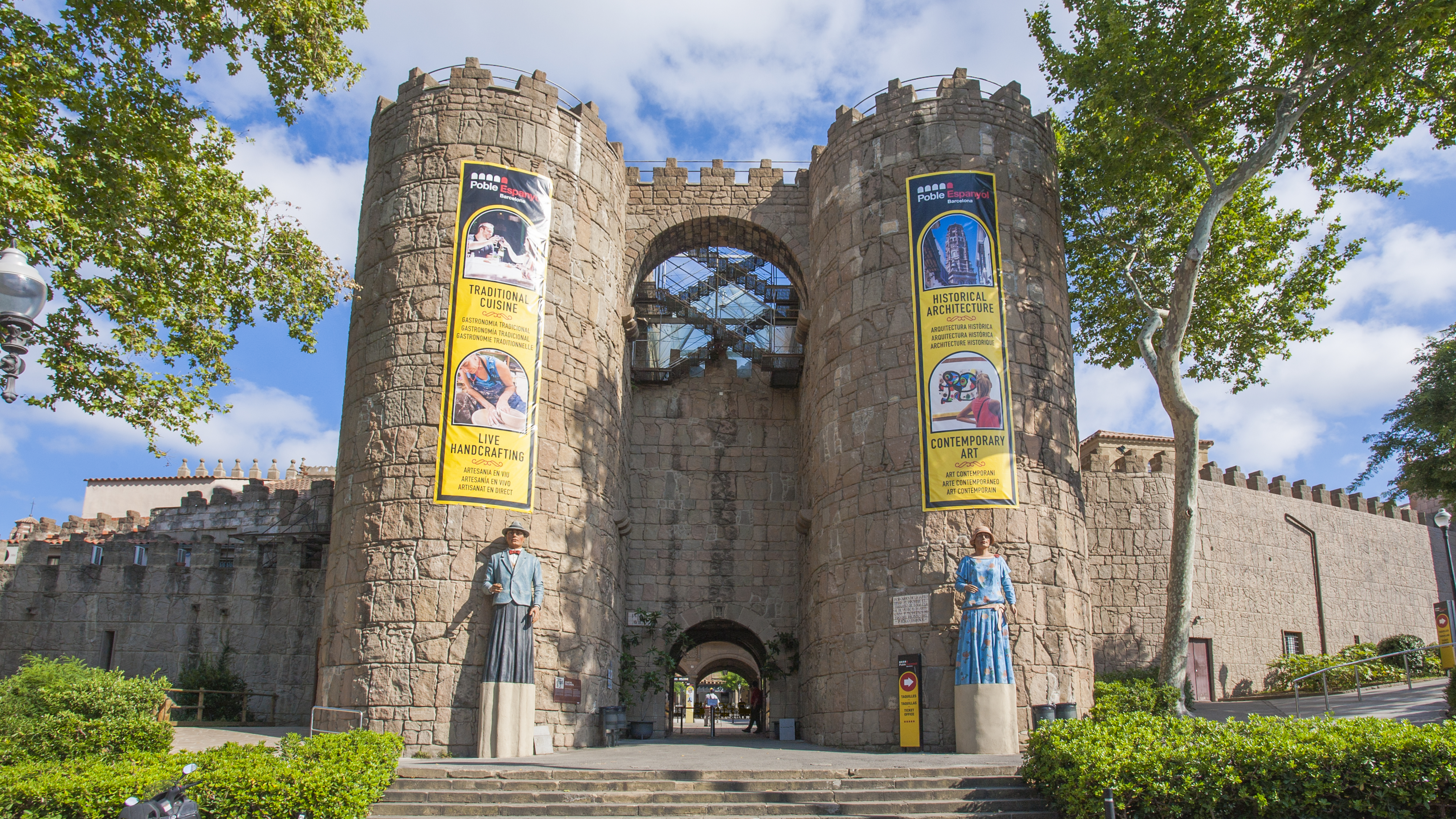
Entrance to the Poble Espanyol, with a reproduction of the walls of Ávila.

One work which had great public success was the Poble Espanyol ("Spanish Town"), a small showground containing reproductions of different urban and architectural environments from the entire national territory, in an atmosphere which ranges from the folkloric to the strictly archaeological. It was designed by the architects Ramon Reventós and Francesc Folguera, with the artistic advice of Miquel Utrillo and Xavier Nogués. The exhibition is divided into six regional areas: Castile and Extremadura, Basque Country and Navarre, Catalonia, Valencia and the Balearic Islands, Andalusia, Aragon and Galicia, around a Grand Plaza and surrounded by walls (a replica of the walls of Ávila). With a surface area of 20,000 m^{2}, it contains 600 buildings, of which 200 can be visited. Among the monuments reproduced some of the most notable are the Mudéjar belltower of Utebo (Zaragoza), the palaces of the marquis of Peñaflor (Seville) and of Ovando Solís (Cáceres), the cloister of Sant Benet de Bages and the Roman belltower of Taradell.

== Impact ==
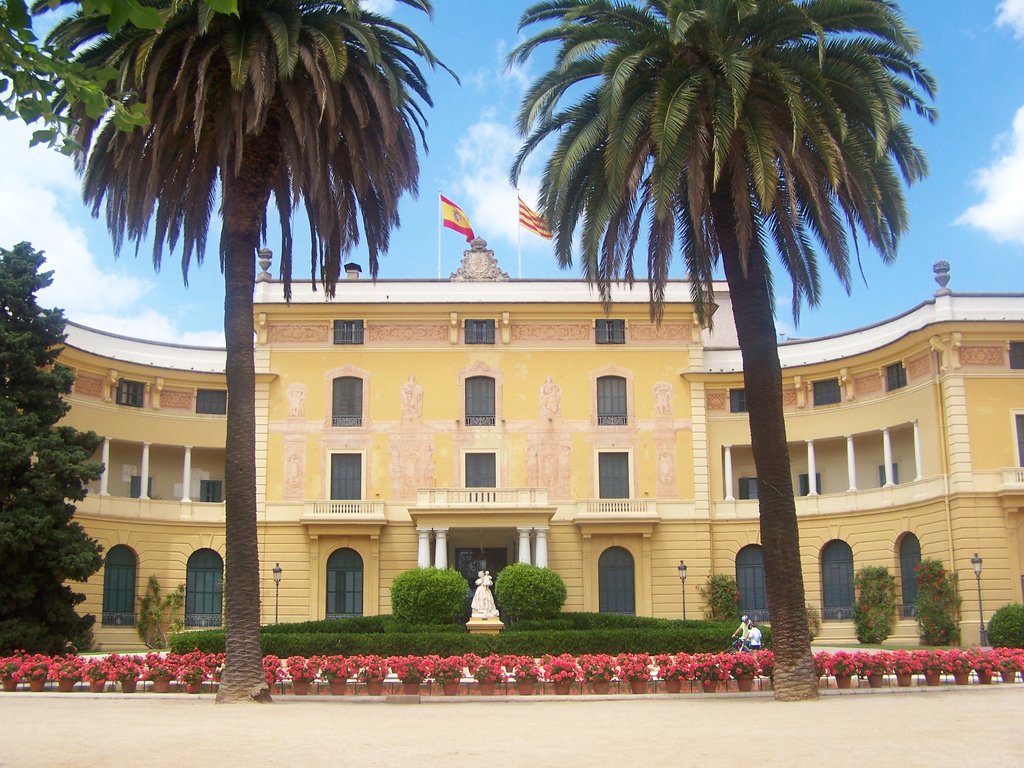
Palau Reial de Pedralbes.

Just as in 1888, the 1929 Exhibition had a great impact on the city of Barcelona at an urban level, not only in Montjuic district, since improvement and refurbishment works were carried out throughout the city: Tetuán, Urquinaona and Letamendi squares were landscaped; the Marina bridge was built; the Plaça de Catalunya was urbanised; and the Avinguda Diagonal was extended to the west and the Gran Via de les Corts Catalanes to the southwest. Various public works were also carried out: street paving and sewer systems were improved, public bathrooms were installed and gas lighting was replaced with electricity. The tradition of ongoing fairs, the Fira de Barcelona, was established.

At the same time, several buildings were remodelled, such as the City Hall, where Josep Maria Sert painted the Salón de Crónicas, and the Generalitat, where the flamboyant bridge over Bisbe street was built. The post office and the Estació de França (France Station) were completed after having spent several years under construction. The Palau Reial de Pedralbes was also built as a residence for the royal family, designed by Eusebi Bona and Francesc Nebot. During this period the first skyscraper in Barcelona was also constructed: the Telefónica building on the corner of Fontanella and Portal del Ángel, designed by Francesc Nebot.

Finally, they improved the city's communications, with construction during the 1920s of the Barcelona El Prat Airport, the removal of level crossings within the city, the improvement of links with the city's peripheral neighbourhoods, the Sarrià train being moved underground (Ferrocarrils de la Generalitat de Catalunya), the electrification of public trams and the extension of metro line 3 to Sants, connecting the Plaza de España with the Exhibition district. The construction of all these public works lead to a great demand for workers, causing a large increase in immigration to the city from all parts of Spain. At the same time, the increase in population lead to the construction of various workers' districts with "cheap housing", such as the Aunós Group in Montjuic and the Milans del Bosch and Baró de Viver Groups in Besós.

== See also ==
- 1888 Barcelona Universal Exposition
- 1992 Summer Olympics
- 2004 Universal Forum of Cultures
- Urban planning of Barcelona
- Sculptures in Plaça de Catalunya

== Bibliography ==
- Barjau, Santi (1992). Enric Sagnier. Labor, Barcelona. ISBN 84-335-4802-6.
- Grandas, M. Carmen (1988). L'Exposició Internacional de Barcelona de 1929. Els llibres de la frontera, Sant Cugat del Vallès. ISBN 84-85709-68-3.
- Roig, Josep L. (1995). Historia de Barcelona. Ed. Primera Plana S.A., Barcelona. ISBN 84-8130-039-X.
- Urrutia, Ángel (1997). Arquitectura española del siglo XX. Cátedra, Madrid. ISBN 84-376-1532-1.
