= Finally See Our Way =

Single by Art vs. Science

from the album The Experiment
- Released: 26 November 2010
- Recorded: 2010
- Genre: Electropop, indie rock
- Length: 3:55
- Label: Independent
- Songwriter(s): Art vs. Science
- Producer(s): Magoo

Art vs. Science singles chronology
"Magic Fountain" (2010)	"Finally See Our Way" (2010)	"A.I.M. Fire!" (2011)

Music video
- "Finally See Our Way" on YouTube

"Finally See Our Way" is a song by Australian electronic band Art vs. Science. It was released in November 2010 as the lead single from their debut album The Experiment (2011)

The song was used by Network Ten to promote Smallville on Eleven in Australia in 2011

The song peaked at number 98 on the ARIA Charts.

At the APRA Music Awards of 2012, the song was nominated for Dance Work of the Year.

== Charts ==
Chart (2010/11)	Peak position
Australia (ARIA)	98
