= Art vs. Science (EP) =

EP by Art vs. Science
- Released: 1 May 2009
- Studio: Big Jesus Burger Studios
- Length: 19:04
- Label: Art vs. Science
- Producers: Art vs. Science, Berkfinger

Art vs. Science chronology
Art vs. Science (2009)	Magic Fountain (2010)

Singles from Art vs. Science
- 1. "Flippers" Released: 2008; 2. "Parlez Vous Francais?" Released: June 2009; 3. "Friend in the Field" Released: 2009

Art vs. Science is the debut extended play from Australian electronic band Art vs. Science, self-released on 1 May 2009. The EP peaked at number 32 on the ARIA Charts in February 2010.

Dan Williams said "We recorded it all in one day, in one session, one mad day; locked ourselves in, with a lot of coffee and a lot of wine. We were set up in a room: it was all very minimal, no metronomes; just the producer screaming at us till we got it right."

At the ARIA Music Awards of 2009, the EP was nominated for Breakthrough Artist – Single.

At the 2009 AIR Awards the EP won Best Independent Dance/Electronica.

== Track listing ==
All tracks are written by Art vs. Science.

No.	Title	Length
1.	"Flippers"	3:34
2.	"Parlez Vous Francais?"	3:33
3.	"Friend in the Field"	3:45
4.	"Take Me to Your Leader"	3:25
5.	"Hollywood"	4:45

== Charts and certification ==
=== Weekly charts ===
Chart (2009/10)	Peak position
Australia (ARIA)	32

== Certifications ==
Region	Certification	Certified units/sales
Australia (ARIA)	Gold	35,000^{^}
^{^} Shipments figures based on certification alone.
