= Off the Edge of the Earth and into Forever, Forever =

Studio album by Art vs. Science
- Released: 9 October 2015
- Label: Art vs. Science

Art vs. Science chronology
Create / Destroy (2014)	Off the Edge of the Earth and into Forever, Forever (2015)	Big OverDrive (2022)

Singles from Off the Edge of the Earth and into Forever, Forever
- 1. "In This Together" Released: April 2015; 2. "Tired of Pretending" Released: September 2015; 3. "Chosen One" Released: January 2016

Off the Edge of the Earth and into Forever, Forever is the second studio album by Australian electronic band Art vs. Science. The album was released in October 2015 and peaked at number 50 on the ARIA Albums Chart.

== Reception ==
Matilda Edwards from The Guardian gave the album 3 out of 5 calling it "a showcase album" saying "The band's staple of summery pop, 70s-era disco and funk remain, but there is a deliberation that was absent in The Experiment: vocals that sound carefully considered and ambitiously complex melodies."

David James Young from Brag Media gave the album 3.5 out of 5 and said "Off the Edge... arrives some four years after [their] eponymous debut... Some hallmarks remain – Dan Williams' gasping hi-hats leading a sped-up roller-disco charge, or the authoritative honk of a low-end synth – but change is afoot once again as they embrace their inner Talking Heads, their inner P-Funk and their inner Flight of the Conchords."

== Track listing ==
All tracks are written by Art Vs. Science.

Off the Edge of the Earth and into Forever, Forever track listing
No.	Title	Length
1.	"In This Together"	4:02
2.	"Chosen One"	3:36
3.	"Tired of Pretending"	5:25
4.	"Unity"	3:04
5.	"You Got to Stop"	3:53
6.	"Stars Part I"	5:36
7.	"Diana"	4:49
8.	"Stars Part II"	4:25
9.	"Bongo Plan"	4:07
10.	"When It's All Over"	4:29

== Charts ==
Chart (2015)	Peak position
Australian Albums (ARIA)	50

== Release history ==
Country	Date	Format	Label	Catalogue
Australia	2015	Digital download, CD, LP	Art vs. Science	AVS005/AVS005V
