= Magic Fountain (EP) =

EP by Art vs. Science
- Released: 14 July 2010
- Genre: Electronica
- Length: 25:33
- Label: Art vs. Science

Art vs. Science chronology
Art vs. Science (2009)	Magic Fountain (2010)	The Experiment (2011)

Singles from Magic Fountain
- 1. "Magic Fountain" Released: June 2010

Magic Fountain is the second extended play by Australian electronic band Art vs. Science. It was released on 14 July 2010.

The first single, "Magic Fountain", reached number 9 on Triple J's hottest 100 2010 countdown.

== Track listing ==
All tracks are written by Art vs Science, except "Boom! Shake the Room", written by Andrew Nolan, Danny Gluckstein, George Clinton, Gregory Webster, Gregory Jacobs, Walter Morrison, Keith Mayberry, Leroy Bonner, Marshall Jones, Marvin Pierce, Norman Napier, Ralph Middlebrooks, Ray Hayden, Robert Easter, Will Smith, William Collins.

No.	Title	Length
1.	"Magic Fountain"	4:43
2.	"Magic Fountain" (Kissy Sell Out's Dark Crystal Version)	5:55
3.	"Magic Fountain" (Dcup Remix)	4:50
4.	"Boom! Shake the Room" (Live at Splendour in the Grass)	5:03
5.	"Parlez-Vous Français?" (Nadastrom Remix)	5:42

== Charts and certifications ==
=== Weekly charts ===
Chart (2010)	Peak position
Australia (ARIA)	14

=== Year-end charts ===
Chart (2010)	Position
Australian Artist (ARIA)	38

== Certifications ==
Region	Certification	Certified units/sales
Australia (ARIA)	Gold	35,000^{^}
^{^} Shipments figures based on certification alone.
