= The Four Columns =

Structures in Barcelona, Spain

Coordinates: 41.370634°N 2.152102°E

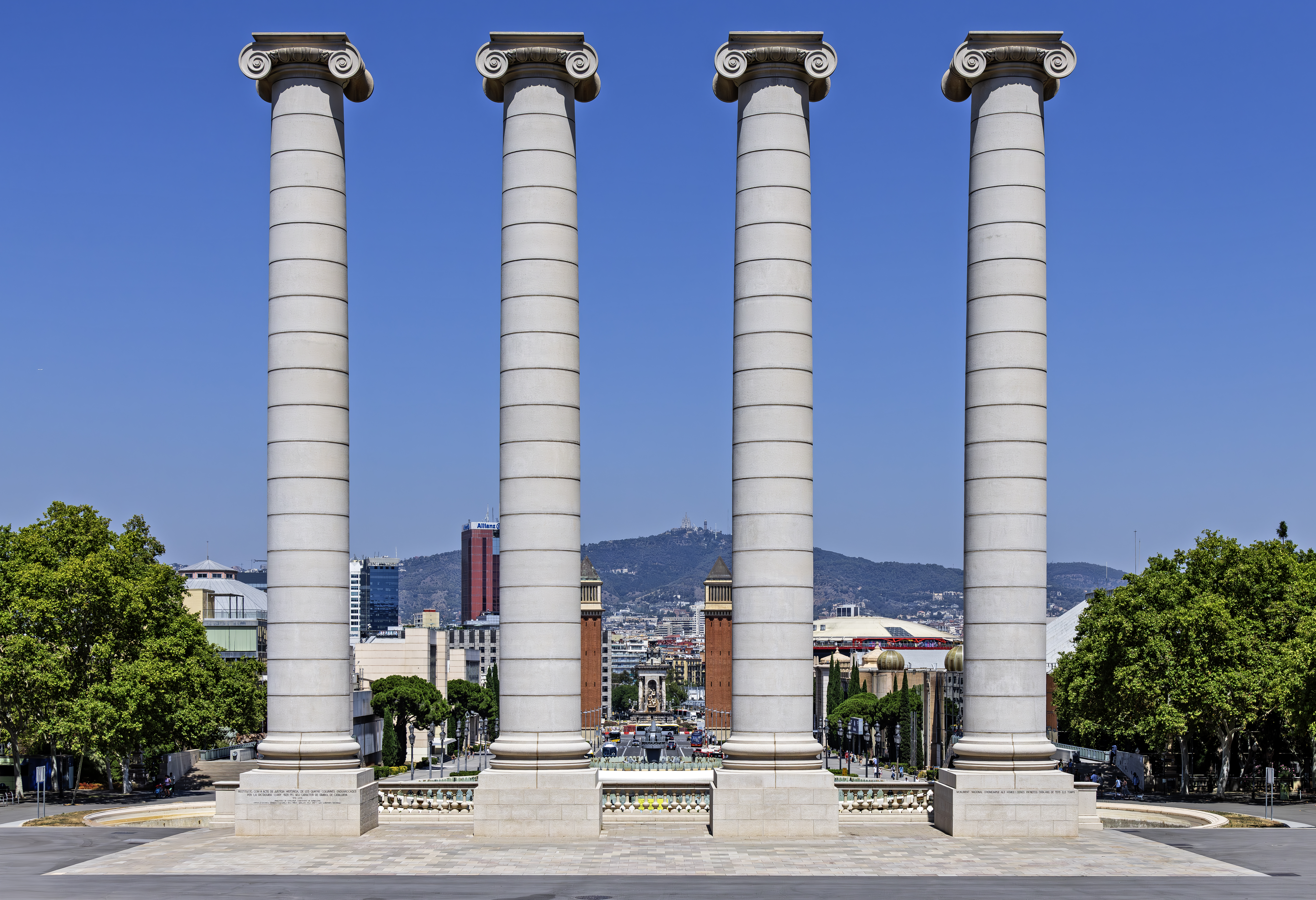
The re-erected Four Columns

The Four Columns ("Les Quatre Columnes" in Catalan) are four Ionic columns originally created by Josep Puig i Cadafalch in Barcelona, Catalonia, Spain. They were erected in 1919, where the Magic Fountain of Montjuïc now stands.

They symbolized the four stripes of the Catalan senyera, and they were intended to become one of the main icons of Catalanism. Because of this, they were demolished in 1928 during Primo de Rivera's dictatorship, when all public Catalanist symbols were systematically removed in order to avoid their being noticed during the 1929 Universal Exposition, which was to take place on Montjuïc.

The 4 columns were restored in December 2010, eighty-two years after their destruction, after a long campaign promoted by the Network of Civic and Cultural Entities of the Catalan Countries.

Moreover, for similar political reasons, Poble Espanyol (Spanish Village in Catalan) on the same hill is the name given to the open-air museum formerly proposed to be named Iberona – in homage to the Iberians, the first inhabitants of what is now Catalonia, Spain. Analogously the nearby Plaça d'Espanya is also similarly named.

In 1999, the Universitat Autònoma de Barcelona (UAB) commissioned the renowned Valencian sculptor Andreu Alfaro to create four similar columns for its Bellaterra Campus. In contrast to the original columns which were 20m high, these spiral up, 25 to 40 metres (82 to 131 ft) in height, in red granite.

== Re-erection ==
After eight years of campaigning by Catalanist civic bodies and the pro-independence political party Esquerra Republicana, a replica of the columns was erected in 2010 very close to the original site and following Puig i Cadafalch's original plans.

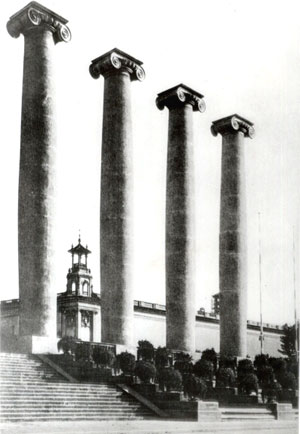
The old Four Columns

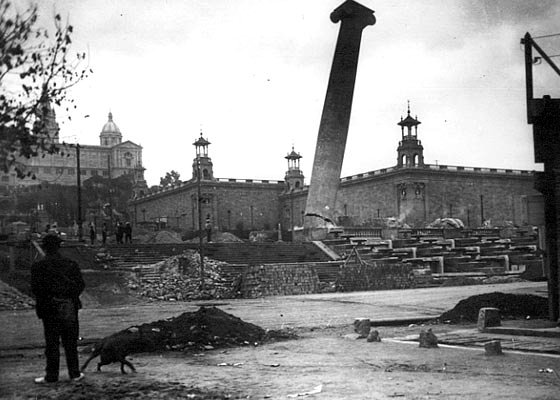
Demolition

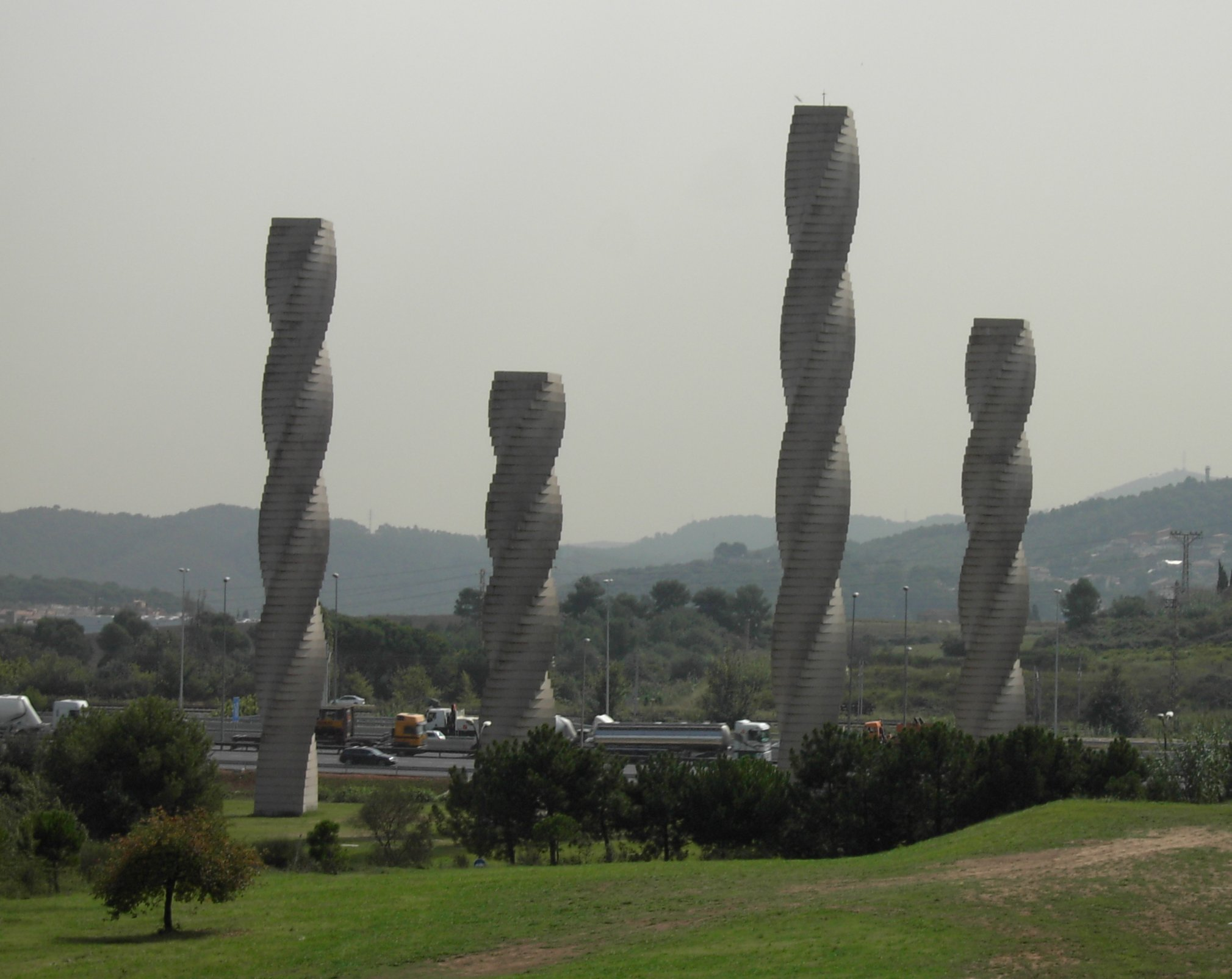
UAB Columns

== See also ==
- History of political Catalanism
