= Art vs. Science =

Australian electronic dance band

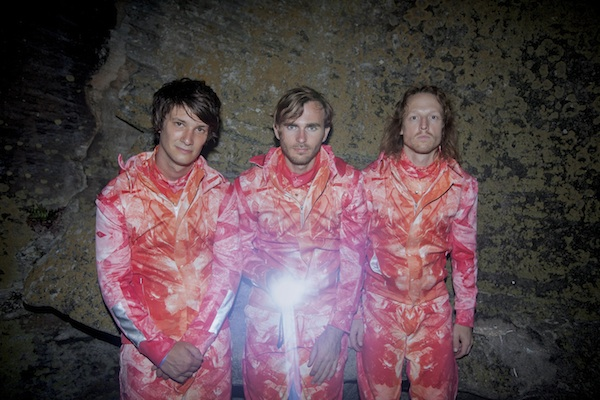
- Art vs. Science in 2014

Background information
- Origin: Sydney, Australia
- Genres: Electro house, dance-punk
- Years active: 2008–present
- Labels: Magellanic; Green; MGM; San City High; Kobalt
- Members: Jim Finn; Dan McNamee; Dan Williams
- Website: artvsscience.net

Art vs. Science are an Australian electronic dance band based in Sydney. Formed in February 2008, the three-piece consists of James Finn (styled as Jim) on vocals and keyboards; Daniel McNamee (styled as Dan Mac) on vocals, guitars and keyboards; and Daniel Williams (styled as Dan W.) on drums and vocals.

The trio received three nominations at the ARIA Music Awards of 2010 for their independent extended play release, Magic Fountain and in 2011, the group won ARIA Award for Best Independent Release for their debut album The Experiment. The album peaked at No. 2 on the ARIA Albums Chart.

== History ==
=== 2008–2009: Formation and early EPs ===
In February 2008, Art vs. Science formed in Sydney as an electro-pop dance band, after Dan McNamee attended a Daft Punk concert in 2007. He convinced his former high school friends, Jim Finn and Dan Williams to join. The trio were ex-members of Roger Explosion, a rock-punk band, which had formed in 2003 and included Finn's brother Tom on bass guitar. By 2007 Roger Explosion had released two extended plays and an album. Art vs. Science has Finn on vocals and keyboards; McNamee on vocals, guitars and keyboards; and Williams (who, at the time, was also a member of Philadelphia Grand Jury) on drums and vocals. The band were booked to play gigs before they had created any songs.

We started jamming for Art vs. Science in February last year. We didn't have any specific songs, we had a loose idea for a few tracks, and our mate asked us to play. We weren't ready but we said yes; wrote seven songs in 48 hours. We tend to work well under pressure.

— Dan Williams, 2009.

The band based their name on two members, one doing an arts degree, the other science. The third member did a language major at university.

After playing gigs and festivals, including the Parklife Festival, Falls Festival, Good Vibrations and touring nationally with The Galvatrons, Art vs. Science received a 2008 Unearthed J Award nomination. Their song, "Flippers" was listed at No. 44 on the Triple J Hottest 100, 2008.

The band undertook its first headline national tour in May 2009, which was sold out. In August, the group embarked on The Eiffel Tour across Australia.

In July 2009, the band gained wider recognition after winning radio station, Triple J's Unearthed competition earning a gig at Splendour in the Grass.

Art vs. Science's debut, self-titled EP was recorded at Big Jesus Burger studios in Surry Hills with producer Simon 'Berkfinger' Berckelman (Philadelphia Grand Jury) and was released in May. Dan Williams said "We recorded it all in one day, in one session, one mad day; locked ourselves in, with a lot of coffee and a lot of wine. We were set up in a room: it was all very minimal, no metronomes; just the producer screaming at us till we got it right."

The EP peaked at No. 32 on the ARIA Singles Chart, and, in December, it was accredited gold record status by ARIA.

At the ARIA Music Awards of 2009, the EP was nominated for ARIA Award for Breakthrough Artist – Single. They also received two AIR Award nominations for 'Best Independent Single' and 'Breakthrough New Independent Artist' and won 'Best Independent Dance Album'. With their colourful mix of pop, French electro, and rock they won the Fasterlouder Festival Award for 'Best Local Act' in 2009.

The band's track "Parlez Vous Francais?", was added to rotation at community radio, Triple J and Nova 96.9. The song was listed at No. 2 on the Triple J Hottest 100, 2009. The video for "Parlez Vous Francais?", directed by Alex Roberts, was nominated for 'Australian Music Video of the Year' at the 2009 J Awards. By the end of the year Williams had to give up playing drums in his other Sydney band, Philadelphia Grand Jury, in order to concentrate full-time on Art vs. Science.

=== 2010–2018: The Experiment and Off the Edge of the Earth and into Forever, Forever ===
Art vs. Science started to gain international recognition, following the inclusion of "Parlez Vous Francais?" on BBC 1 DJ Kissy Sell Out's cover-mount compilation on UK taste-making magazine Mixmag, airplay on John Kennedy's XFM's show and blog attention, courtesy of a remix package including tracks by Bumblebeez and Nadastrom. XFM also named the band one of the 20 Bands to Watch in 2010. In 2010, the group toured the United Kingdom in support of La Roux in March and then Groove Armada in May. Their track, "Hollywood", appears on the soundtrack of the basketball video game NBA 2K11. The band released its second EP, Magic Fountain, in August 2010, which reached No. 14 on the ARIA Singles Chart. The title track reached No. 9 on the Triple J Hottest 100, 2010. At the ARIA Music Awards of 2010 the band received three nominations, ARIA Award for Best Dance Release, ARIA Award for Best Independent Release and Best Video for "Magic Fountain". In October, Art vs. Science started recording their debut album, The Experiment, in Queensland with producer Magoo.

The band's next single, and official lead single from their debut album, "Finally See Our Way", premiered on Triple J's The Breakfast Show with Tom & Alex on 22 November 2010 and was released on 26 November. In March 2011 the group supported The Chemical Brothers' Australian tour. Art vs. Science signed with Kobalt Music Australia, the label's first local signing. Their album was released in Australia on 25 February 2011.

In early 2014, the band released a single entitled "Create/Destroy", as well as releasing a music video for a new song entitled "I Was a Child Once". "I Was a Child Once" is the result of an experimental collaboration and recording project open to the public, dubbed a world first. The project, named "Open Studio" was presented by Pedestrian TV and Ben Sherman, who opened a recording studio at Ben Sherman's Sydney Arcade flagship store for five days in February 2014. The completed video and song was published to YouTube on 23 March 2014.

=== 2019–present: Big Overdrive ===
In May 2019, the band released the non-album single "Zeus in the Architecture"; the first taste of their most recent sessions.

In November 2021, their first single in 18 months "SWEAT" was released alongside a music video directed by Angus “Beef” McGuigan. The band started touring again with the SWEAT tour for a few months after the single's release.

In July 2022, the band released "I Saw You" and announced their third album Big Overdrive, which was released on 5 August 2022.

== Members ==
- Jim Finn – keyboards, bass, vocals
- Dan McNamee – keyboards, guitar, vocals
- Dan Williams – drums, vocals

== Discography ==
=== Studio albums ===
List of studio albums with chart positions
Title	Details	Peak chart positions
Title	Details	AUS
The Experiment	Released: 25 February 2011; Label: Art vs Science (AVS003); Format: CD, LP, digital	2
Off the Edge of the Earth and into Forever, Forever	Released: 9 October 2015; Label: Art vs Science (AVS005); Format: CD, LP, digital	50
Big Overdrive	Released: 5 August 2022; Label: Art vs Science (AVS006); Format: LP, digital	—

=== EPs ===
List of extended play with selected details
Title	Details	Peak chart positions	Certifications
Title	Details	AUS	Certifications
Art vs. Science	Released: 1 May 2009; Label: Art vs Science (AVS001); Format: CD, digital, LP	32	ARIA: Gold
Magic Fountain	Released: 6 August 2010; Label: Art vs Science (AVS002); Format: CD, digital	14	ARIA: Gold
Create / Destroy	Released: 4 April 2014; Label: Art vs Science (AVS004); Format: CD, digital	-	

=== Singles ===
List of singles as lead artist and chart position
Title	Year	Peak chart positions	Album
Title	Year	AUS	Album
"Flippers"	2008	-	Art vs. Science
"Parlez Vous Francais?"	2009	(Note: Sales from "Parlez Vous Francais?" counted towards Art vs. Science EP. "Parlez Vous Francais?" peaked at number 41 on the ARIA digital sales chart.)	Art vs. Science
"Friend in the Field"	2009	(Note: "Friend in the Field" was released as a radio promotional single. Sales from "Friend in the Field" counted towards Art vs. Science EP)	Art vs. Science
"Magic Fountain"	2010	(Note: Sales from "Magic Fountain" counted towards Magic Fountain EP. "Magic Fountain" peaked at umber 17 on the ARIA digital sales chart.)	Magic Fountain
"Finally See Our Way"	2010	98	The Experiment
"A.I.M. Fire!"	2011	-	The Experiment
"Higher"	2011	-	The Experiment
"With Thoughts"	2011	-	The Experiment
"Create / Destroy"	2014	-	Create / Destroy
"Creature of the Night"	2014	-	Create / Destroy
"In This Together"	2015	-	Off the Edge of the Earth and into Forever, Forever
"Tired of Pretending"	2015	-	Off the Edge of the Earth and into Forever, Forever
"Chosen One"	2016	-	Off the Edge of the Earth and into Forever, Forever
"Wickoo"	2017	-	Non-album singles
"Zeus in the Architecture"	2019	-	Non-album singles
"Enter Sandman"	2019	-	Triple J Like a Version
"Icycle Bicycle"	2020	-	Non-album single
"Sweat"	2021	-	Big OverDrive
"Centaur"	2021	-	Big OverDrive
"Dance"	2022	-	Big OverDrive
"Monkey"	2022	-	Big OverDrive
"I Saw You"	2022	-	Big OverDrive
"Moonlight"	2022	-	Big OverDrive
"Check the Boombox"	2022	-	Big OverDrive
"Mick Jagger with a Laser"	2022	-	Big OverDrive (Deluxe)
"Powder"	2025	-	
"Balance and Complexity"	-		

== Awards and nominations ==
=== AIR Awards ===
The Australian Independent Record Awards (commonly known informally as AIR Awards) is an annual awards night to recognise, promote and celebrate the success of Australia's Independent Music sector.

Year	Nominee / work	Award	Result
2009	Art vs. Science	Best Independent Dance/Electronic Album	Won
2009	Art vs. Science	Best Independent Single/EP	Nominated
2009	Art vs. Science	Breakthrough Independent Artist	Nominated
2011	Art vs. Science	Best Independent Artist	Nominated
2011	The Experiment	Best Independent Album	Nominated
2011	The Experiment	Best Independent Dance/Electronic Album	Nominated

=== APRA Awards ===
The APRA Awards are presented annually from 1982 by the Australasian Performing Right Association (APRA), "honouring composers and songwriters". Art vs. Science have received two nominations, both for Dance Work of the Year.

Year	Nominee / work	Award	Result
2010	"Parlez Vous Francais" (James Finn, Daniel McNamee, Daniel Williams)	Song of the Year	Shortlisted
2011	"Magic Fountain" (James Finn, Daniel McNamee, Daniel Williams)	Dance Work of the Year	Nominated
2012	"Finally See Our Way" (James Finn, Daniel McNamee, Daniel Williams)	Dance Work of the Year	Nominated

=== ARIA Awards ===
The ARIA Music Awards are presented annually from 1987 by the Australian Recording Industry Association (ARIA). Art vs. Science have won one award from six nominations.

Year	Nominee / work	Award	Result
2009	"Art vs. Science"	Breakthrough Artist - Single	Nominated
2010	"Magic Fountain"	Best Independent Release	Nominated
2010	"Magic Fountain"	Best Dance Release	Nominated
2010	"Magic Fountain" – Alex Roberts	Best Video	Nominated
2011	The Experiment	Best Independent Release	Won
2011	The Experiment	Best Cover Art	Nominated

=== J Awards ===
The J Awards are an annual series of Australian music awards that were established by the Australian Broadcasting Corporation's youth-focused radio station Triple J. They commenced in 2005.

Year	Nominee / work	Award	Result
2008	Art vs Science	Unearthed Artist of the Year	Nominated
2009	"Parlez Vous Francais?"	Music Video of the Year	Won
2011	The Experiment	Album of the Year	Nominated
2011	"A.I.M. Fire"	Music Video of the Year	Nominated
