= Poble Espanyol =

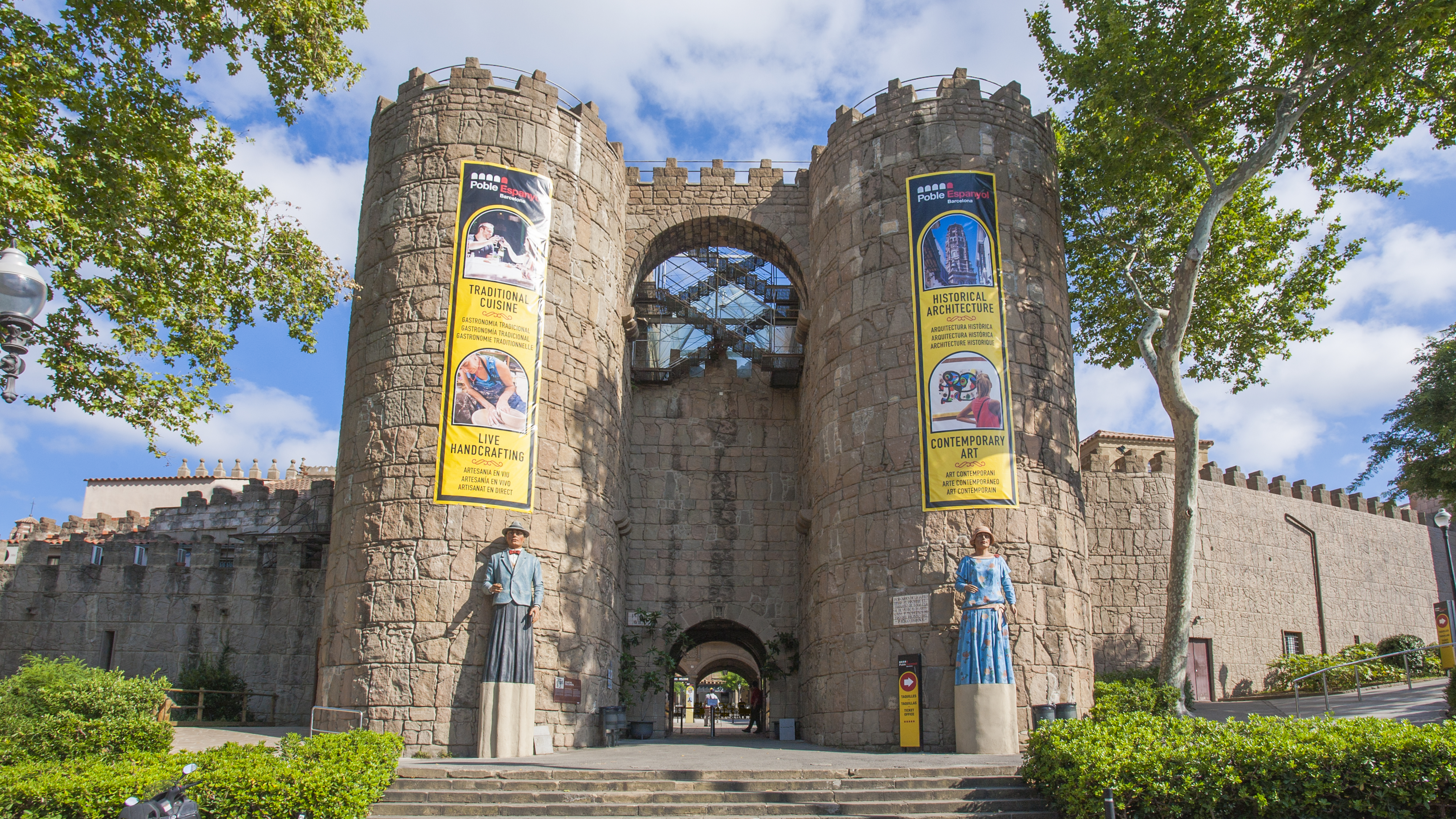
- Gate of Avila replica
- Established: 1929
- Location: Avda. Francesc Ferrer i Guardia, 13, Barcelona, Spain
- Coordinates: 41.3687°N 2.1483°E
- Type: Architectural Museum
- Director: Anton Vidal
- Architects: Francesc Folguera i Grassi (architect); Ramon Reventós (architect); Miquel Utrillo (art critic); Xavier Nogués (painter)
- Website: www.poble-espanyol.com

The Poble Espanyol (literally, Spanish Village) is an open-air architectural museum in Barcelona, Catalonia, Spain, approximately 400 metres (1,300 ft) away from the Fountains of Montjuïc. It is listed as a Cultural Asset of Local Interest (Bé Cultural d'Interès Local). Built for the 1929 Barcelona International Exposition, the museum consists of 117 full-scale buildings replicated from different places in Spain, put together to form a small town recreating urban atmospheres of a variety of places with a range of architectural styles. These buildings house a theater, restaurants, artisan workshops and a museum of contemporary art.

== History ==
The museum was built from 1926 to 1929 for the 1929 Barcelona International Exposition as an exhibit of the architecture and townscapes found in different places in Spain. The idea was promoted by the Catalan architect Puig i Cadafalch and the project was realized by architects Francesc Folguera i Grassi and Ramon Reventós i Farrarons, art critic and painter Miquel Utrillo and painter Xavier Nogués.

The four professionals and the driver Santiago ("el Santiac") travelled some 20,000 kilometers, visiting over 1,600 sites to select and document examples of the most emblematic architecture in each region, the aim being to recreate an "ideal village" that contained the main characteristics of the different peninsular regions, in an attempt to synthesize characteristics that might be attributed to the Spanish traditional architecture. This ensemble is proof of the wide variety of architecture and architectural styles in Spain, comprising a strangely amalgamated yet somehow nicely harmonious ‘Spanish’ village, although there is not a unified style or solid common traits shared among the different regions and cultures that form Spain.

== Gallery ==
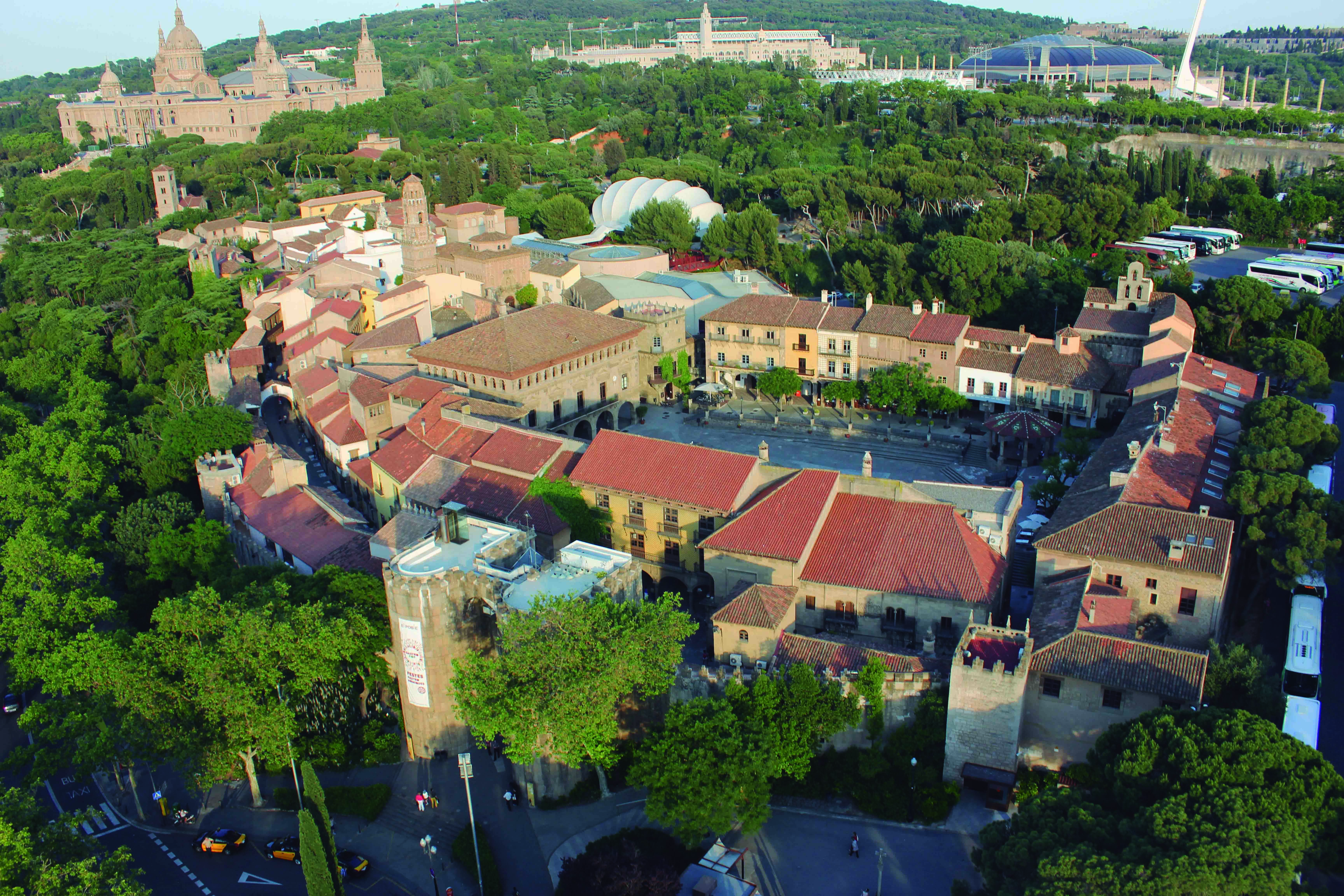
Aerial view of the complex, with its arcaded main square, mudéjar belltower, Lombard-Catalan Romanesque belltower, etc. In the background, the MNAC and the Olympic stadiums are visible.

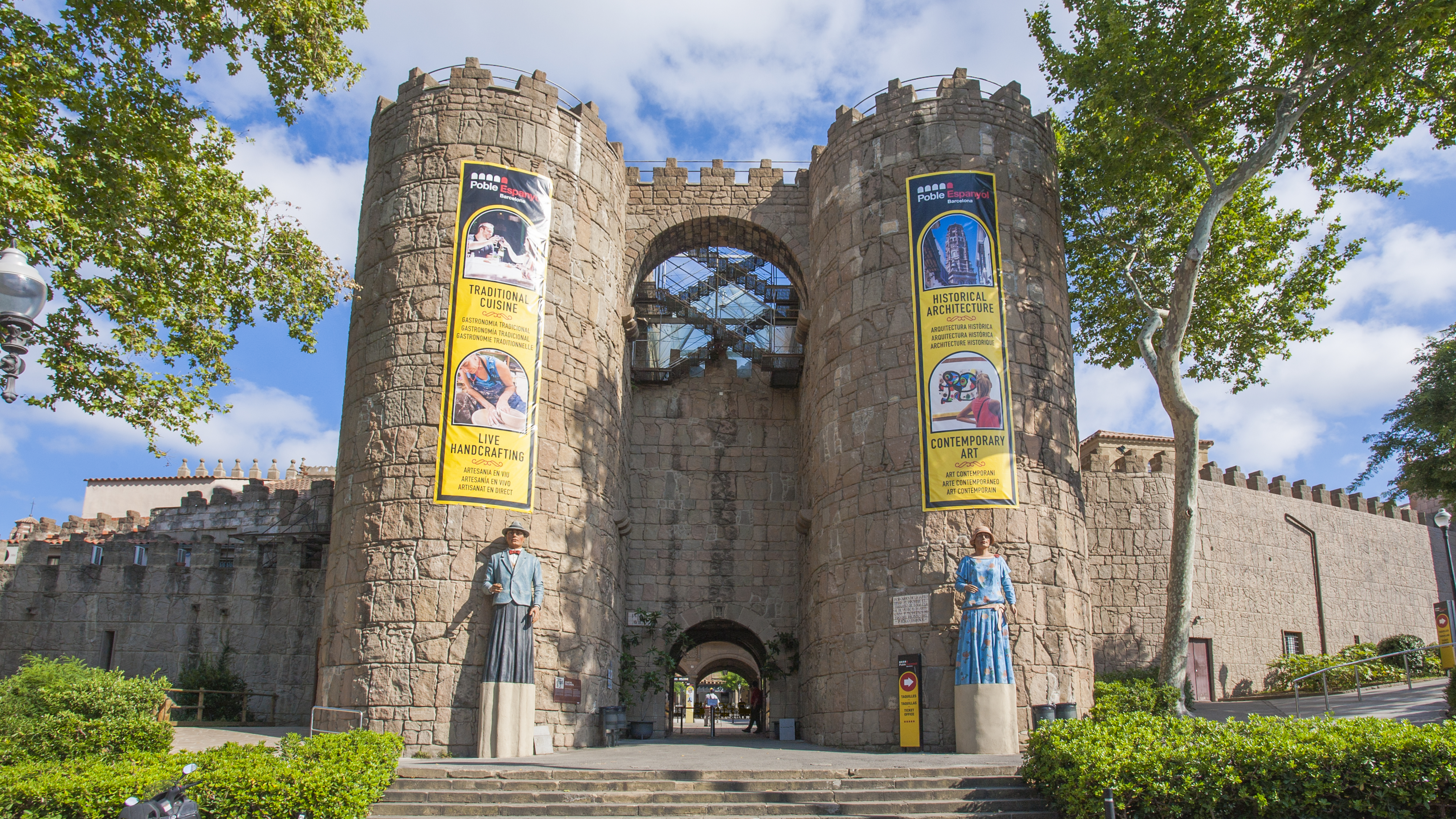
Replica of the San Vicente Gate in Ávila's Medieval ramparts (late 13th century), with the Poble Espanyol Giants in front.

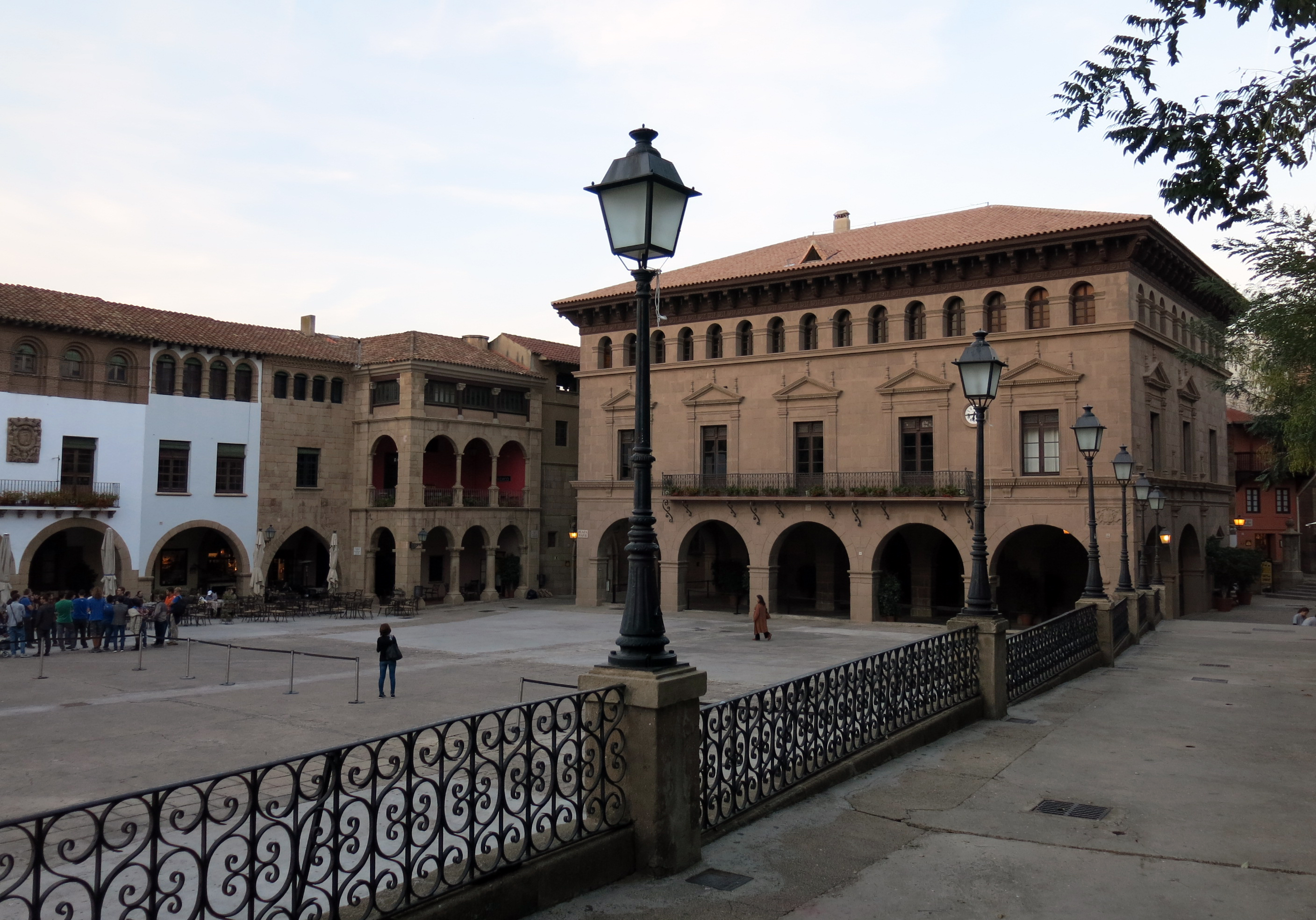
The central square with a replica of the Vall-de-roures town hall, a Renaissance building, and other buildings with arcades.

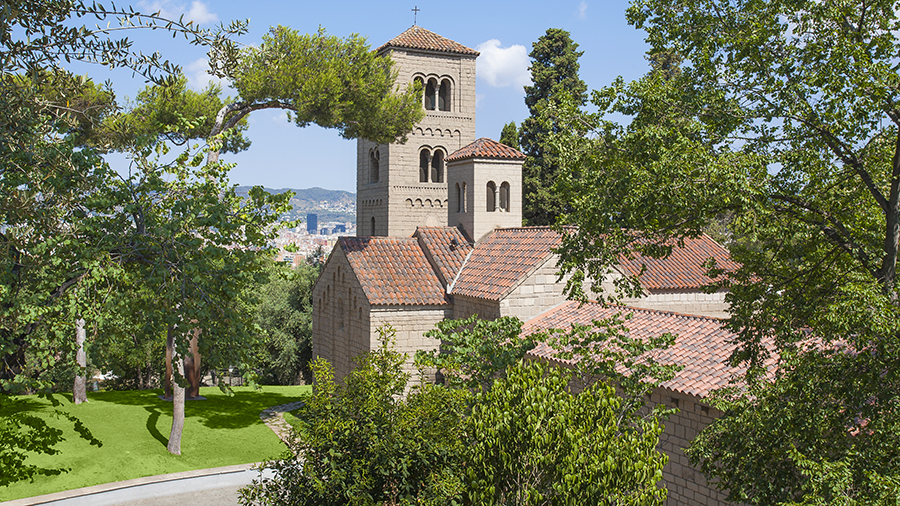
Romanesque monastery of Sant Miquel, a recreation of a Catalan Romanesque monastery based on various real models, with Lombard belltower, cloister and frescoes inside.

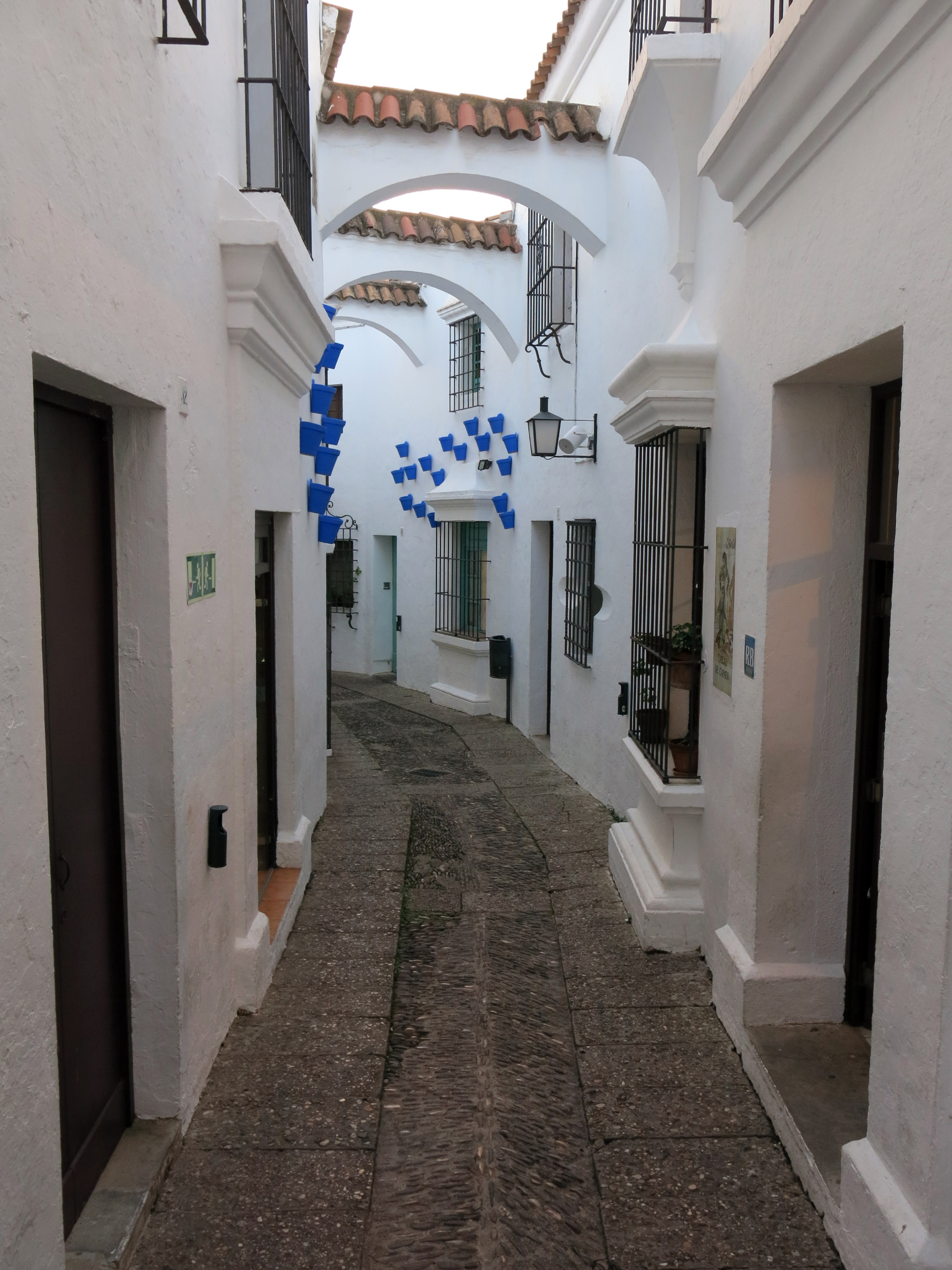
Andalús Neighborhood: replica of Calle Cuna, in Arcos de la Frontera.

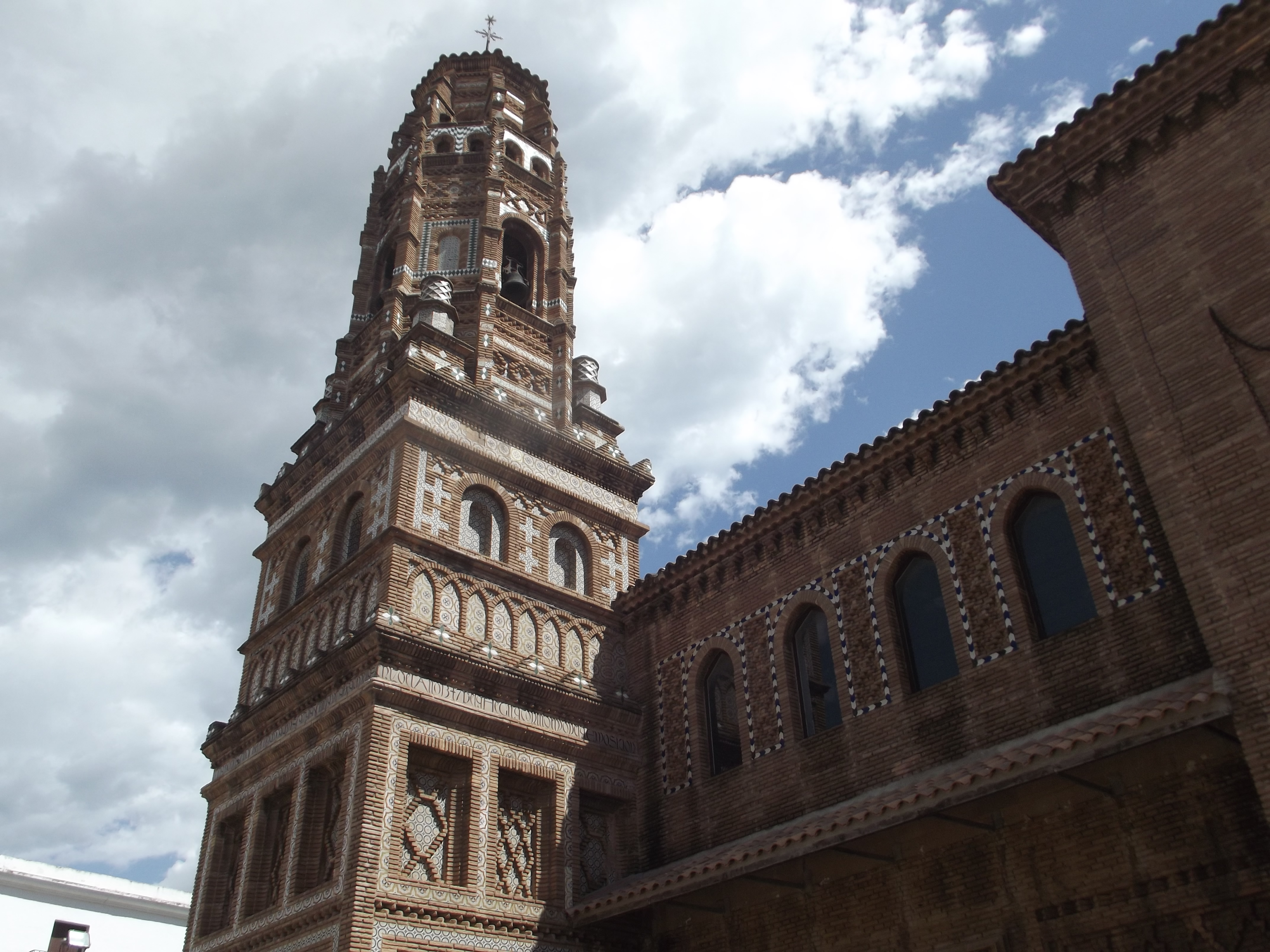
Replica of the 16th-century, Renaissance Mudéjar belltower (Tower of Mirrors) of the Our Lady of the Assumption Church in Utebo (Saragossa Province), at the Aragonese Square.
