= The Magic Fountain =

- Directed by: Allan David
- Written by: John Lehman
- Story by: Jacob Grimm, Wilhelm Grimm
- Produced by: Allan David
- Cinematography: Wolf Schneider
- Edited by: Richard Hertel
- Music by: Jacques Belasco
- Release date: August 1961 (USA)
- Running time: 85 minutes
- Country: United States
- Language: English

The Magic Fountain is a 1961 film starring Peter Nestler and Helmo Kindermann.
