= Parlez Vous Francais? (Art vs. Science song) =

Single by Art vs. Science

from the album Art vs. Science
- Released: 2009
- Recorded: 2008
- Length: 3:33
- Label: Art vs. Science
- Songwriters: Jim Finn, Daniel Mcnamee, Daniel Williams
- Producers: Art vs. Science, Berkfinger

Art vs. Science singles chronology
"Flippers" (2008)	"Parlez Vous Francais?" (2009)	"Friend in the Field" (2009)

Music video
- Parlez Vous Francais? on YouTube

"Parlez Vous Francais?" [sic] is a song released by Australian electronic band Art vs. Science as a radio single in 2009. It was released as the second single from their debut self-titled EP. Sales towards the track counted toward the EP; however, the song charted at number 41 on the ARIA Digital Track Chart.

In the Triple J Hottest 100, 2009, the song was voted at number 2.

The video for "Parlez Vous Francais?", directed by Alex Roberts, was nominated for 'Australian Music Video of the Year' at the 2009 J Awards.

The song was released in the UK as a double-A sided single with "Flippers" in 2010.

In 2015, the band reflected saying "When we first started playing it, we asked every French person we found if the grammar was right. And they were always like 'yeah, it's really cool'. But then we played it in Paris and they were like 'what the fuck? Are you mocking us?'. I think it must sound confusing. Like if a French person was singing 'Do. You. Speak. English. Steak and chips and driving fast'. I think it just doesn't make actual sense in French."

== Track listing ==
"Parlez Vous Francais?"/"Flippers" (UK)
No.	Title	Length
1.	"Parlez Vous Francais?"	3:33
2.	"Parlez Vous Francais?" (Lee Mortimer Remix)	5:21
3.	"Parlez Vous Francais?" (Decibel Remix)	6:31
4.	"Parlez Vous Francais?" (Disco of Doom Remix)	5:16
5.	"Flippers"	3:34

== Charts ==
Chart (2009/10)	Peak position
Australia (ARIA Digital Track Chart)	41

== Release history ==
Country	Date	Format	Version	Label	Catalogue
Australia	2009	radio	Original	Art Vs. Science	AU-VS3-09-00002
United Kingdom	2010	Digital download	remixes		
