= Magic Fountain of Montjuïc =

Fountain in Barcelona, Spain

Coordinates: 41°22′16.15″N 02°09′06.25″E

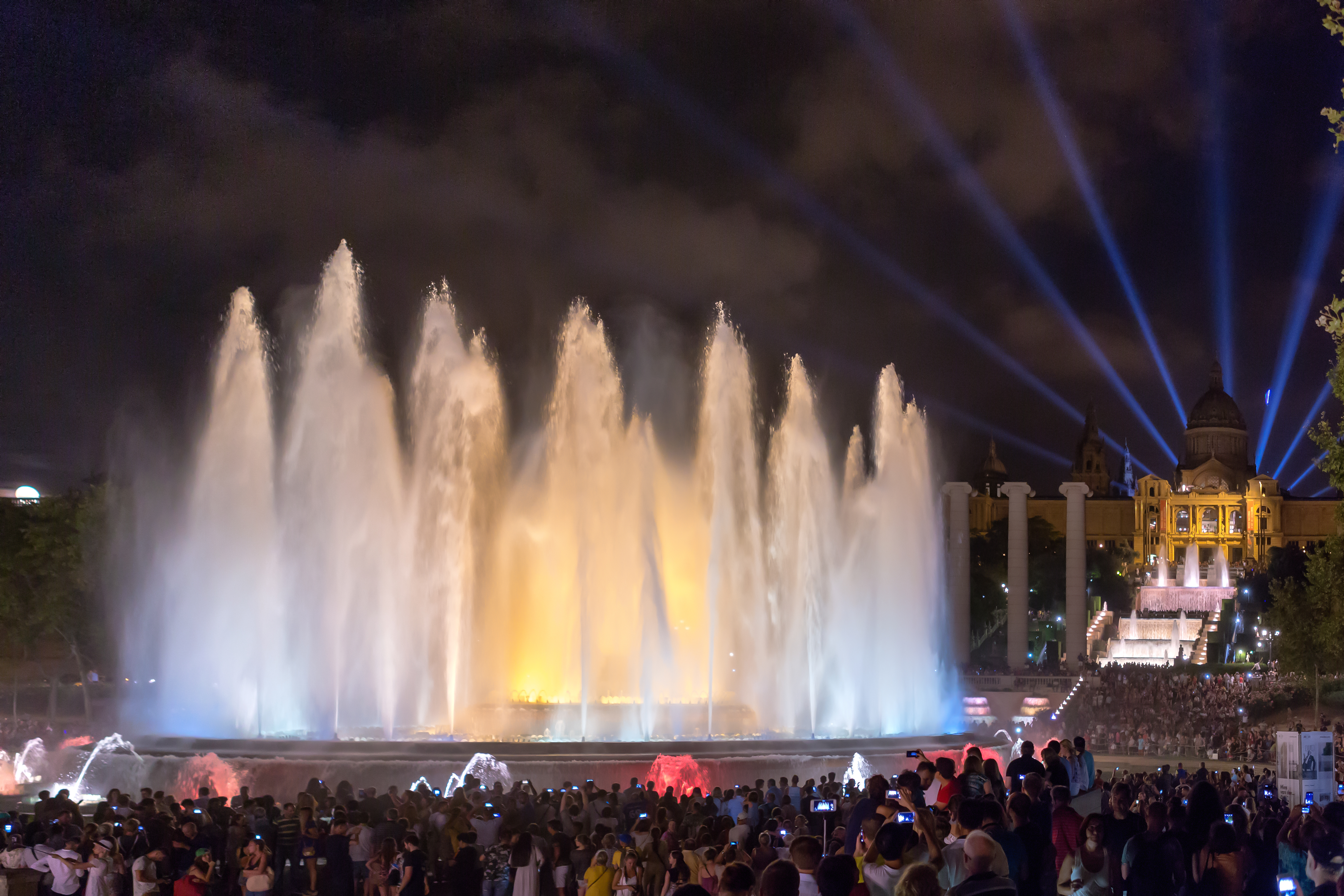
Font Màgica in 2016

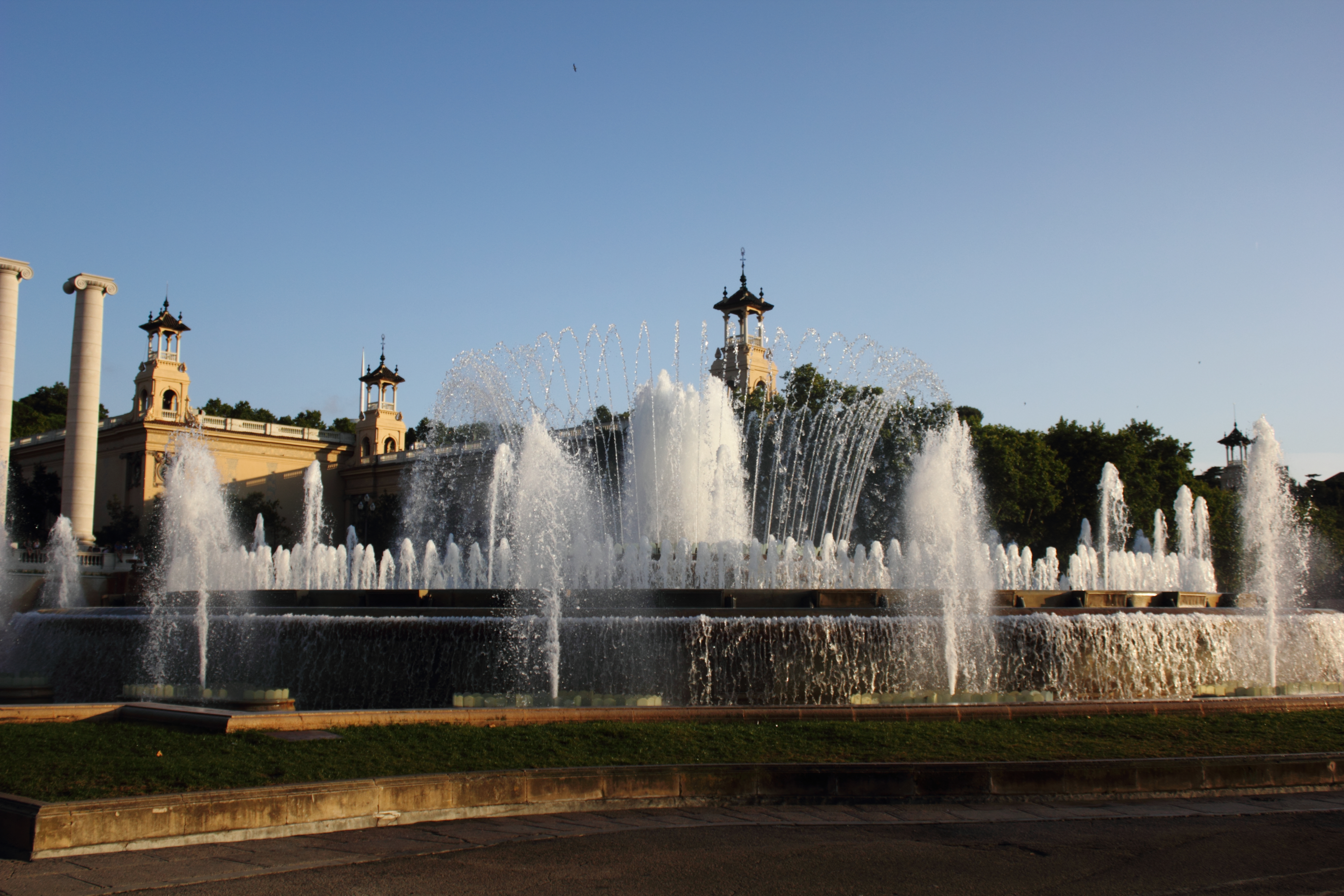
Daytime view of the fountain

The Magic Fountain of Montjuïc (Catalan: Font màgica de Montjuïc, Spanish: Fuente mágica de Montjuïc) is a fountain located at the head of Avinguda Maria Cristina in the Montjuïc neighborhood of Barcelona, Catalonia, Spain. The fountain is situated below the Palau Nacional on the Montjuïc mountain and near the Plaça d'Espanya and Poble Espanyol de Barcelona. The fountain, like most of the surrounding developments, was constructed for the 1929 Barcelona International Exposition.

The fountain sprays 700 gallons of water a second through 3620 jets to create its effect. The highest water spout is 170 feet.

== History ==
The Magic Fountain was designed by Carles Buïgas, who had designed illuminated fountains as early as 1922. The site where the fountain was constructed was the previous location of The Four Columns. The columns, representative of the Catalanism movement, were demolished in 1928 under the orders of Prime Minister Miguel Primo de Rivera and were re-erected in 2010 a few meters away from the original location.

Buïgas submitted his design a year before the exhibition, with many calling the plan too ambitious, with too little time to complete. The construction project utilized over 3,000 workers. The first show took place on May 19, 1929, the day before the start of the Exposition. The fountain was badly damaged in the Spanish Civil War and did not operate until 1955, after Buïgas oversaw needed repairs.

In the 1980s, music was incorporated with the light show and the fountain, along with the Museu Nacional d'Art de Catalunya, was completely restored prior to the 1992 Summer Olympics, held at Montjuïc. Performances include film, classical, and modern music, such as The Godfather, The Lord of the Rings, Gladiator, a Spanish zarzuela movement, "Barcelona" by Freddie Mercury and Montserrat Caballé, and modern pop songs. Performances take place at half-hour intervals every weekend, with weekends extended during the summer season.
