= Magic Fountain (song) =

Single by Art vs. Science

from the album Magic Fountain
- Released: June 2010
- Length: 4:43
- Label: Art vs. Science
- Songwriter(s): Jim Finn, Daniel Mcnamee, Daniel Williams

Art vs. Science singles chronology
"Friend in the Field" (2009)	"Magic Fountain" (2010)	"Finally See Our Way" (2010)

Music video
- Magic Fountain on YouTube

"Magic Fountain" is a song released by Australian electronic band Art vs. Science as a radio single in June 2010. It was released as the lead single from their second EP of the same name. Sales towards the track counted toward the EP; however, the song charted at number 17 on the ARIA Digital Track Chart.

In the Triple J Hottest 100, 2010, the song was voted at number 9.

The video, directed by Alex Roberts, was nominated for the ARIA Award for Best Video at the ARIA Music Awards of 2010.

== Charts ==
Chart (2010)	Peak position
Australia (ARIA Digital Track Chart)	17

== Release history ==
Country	Date	Format	Version	Label	Catalogue
Australia	June 2010	radio	Original	Art Vs. Science	AU-VS3-10-00001
