= Tibidabo Funicular =

Railway in Barcelona, Spain

Coordinates: 41°24′59.2″N 2°7′51.9″E

Funicular del Tibidabo
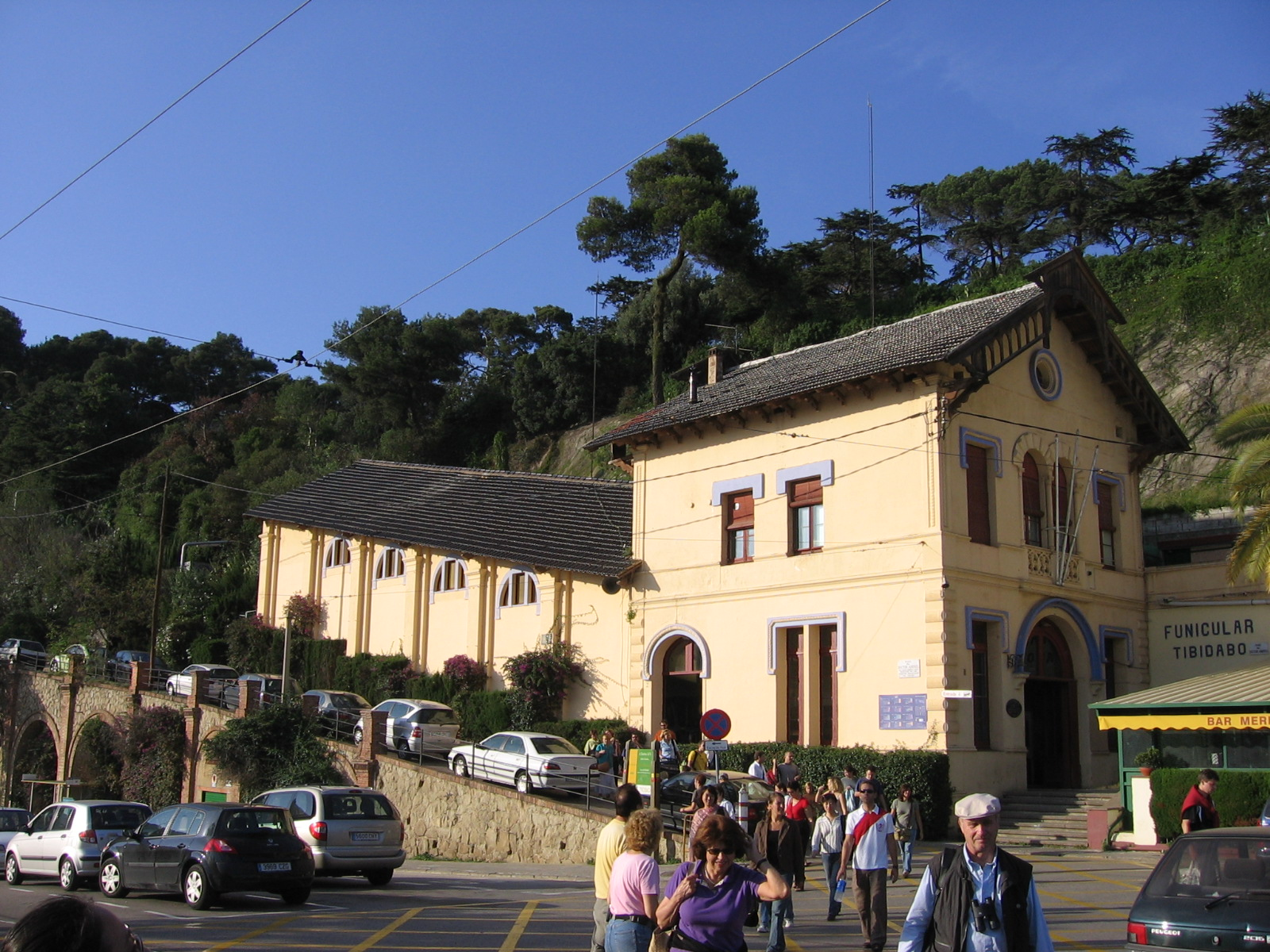
- The lower station at Plaça Dr. Andreu

Overview
- Service type: Funicular
- Locale: Barcelona

Route
- Termini: Plaça del Doctor Andreu (Tramvia Blau); Tibidabo
- Distance travelled: 1,130 m (3,710 ft)

The Tibidabo Funicular (Catalan: Funicular del Tibidabo; Spanish: Funicular del Tibidabo) is a funicular railway in the city of Barcelona, in Catalonia, Spain. The line connects Plaça del Doctor Andreu, the upper terminus of the Tramvia Blau, with the summit of Tibidabo, where there is an amusement park and a church, the Temple Expiatori del Sagrat Cor.

The funicular is one of three in Barcelona, the others being the Funicular de Vallvidrera and the Funicular de Montjuïc. After modernisation works the funicular recommenced operations with new trainsets nicknamed "La Cuca de llum" in June 2021 during a period of upgrade works from 2019.

The Tramvia Blau, along with a parallel bus service, provides a connection from Avinguda Tibidabo metro station. This is the terminus of line 7 of the Barcelona Metro, operated by the FGC from a city terminus at Plaça de Catalunya.

Like the Tramvia Blau, the funicular is not part of Autoritat del Transport Metropolità (ATM) integrated fare network. Tickets must be separately purchased from ticket offices or machines at the terminal stations prior to travel.

== History ==
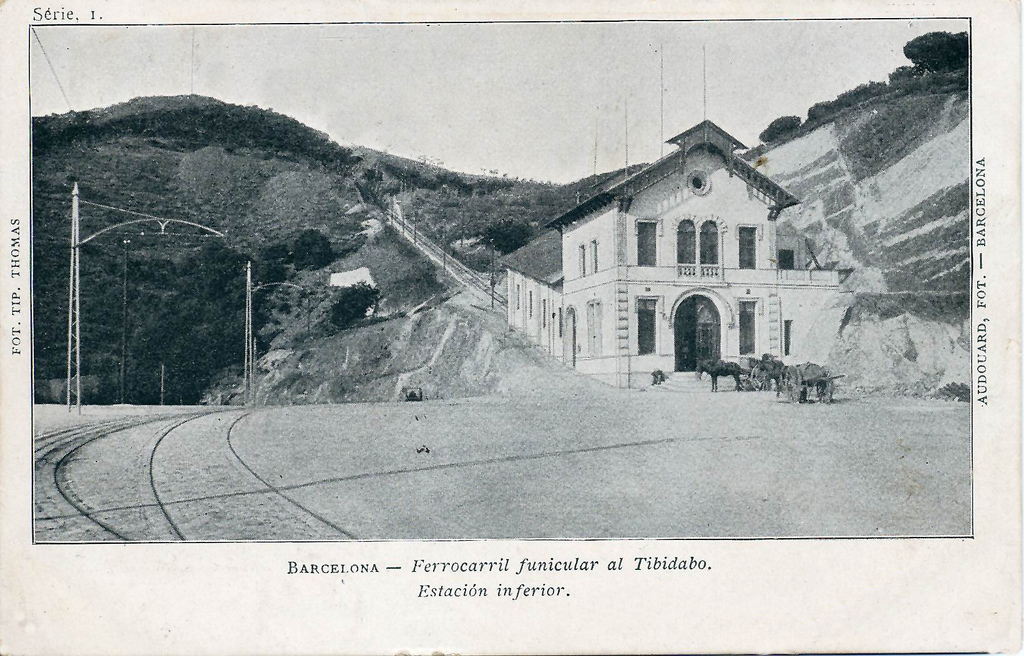
Funicular circa 1900

The line was opened on October 29, 1901, with a length of 1,130 metres (3,710 ft). It has been modernised in 1922, 1958 and most recently in 2021.

== Technical details ==
The funicular has the following technical parameters:

Number of stops	2
Configuration	Single track with passing loop
Track length	1,130 metres (3,707 ft)
Rise	275 metres (902 ft)
Maximum gradient	25.7%
Traction	Electricity

== Rolling stock ==
=== 2021 - present ===
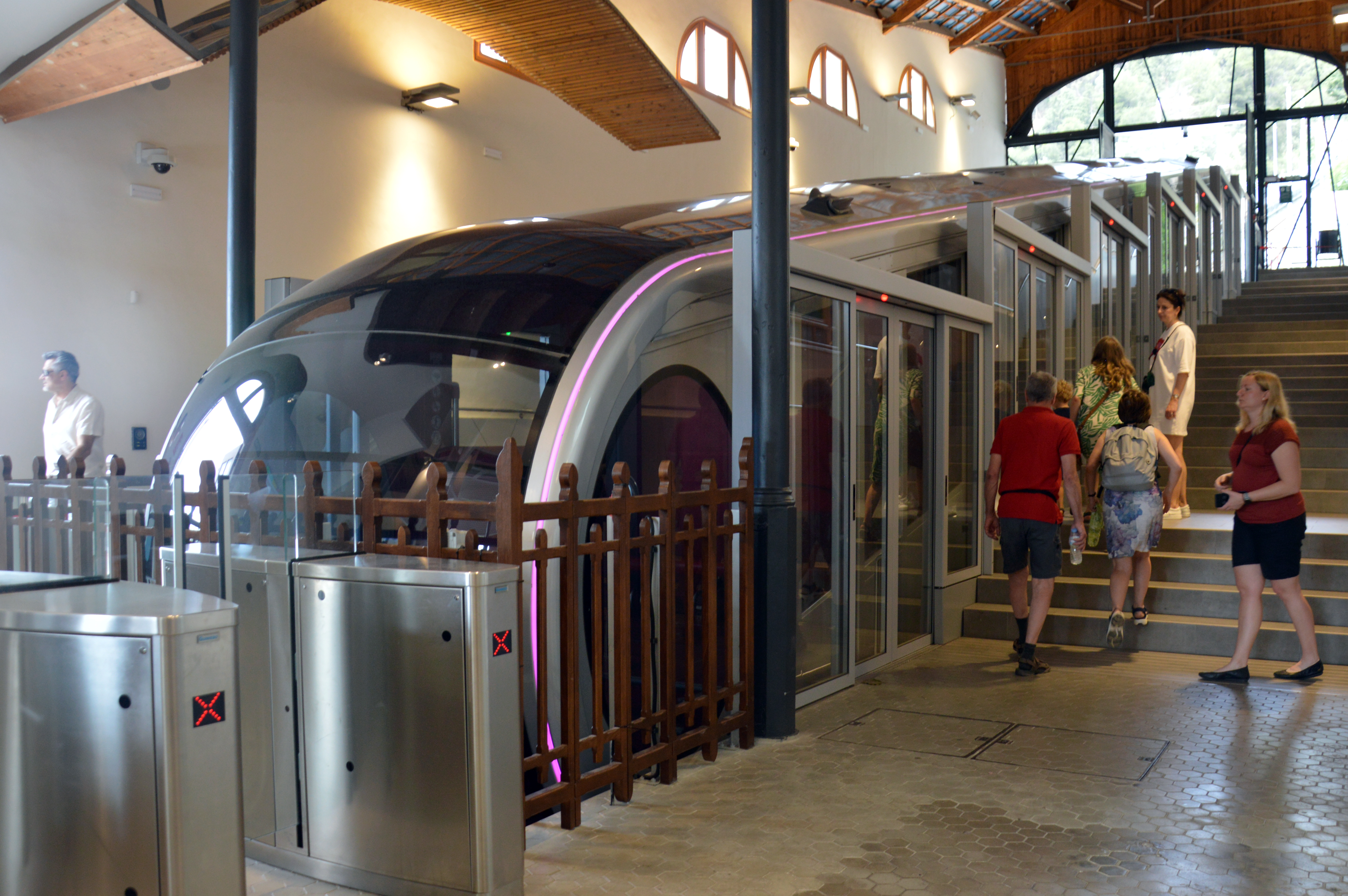
New car in use (2023)

After overhaul works to infrastructure between 2019 and 2021, new cars began operating on completely replaced tracks featuring a wider gauge of 1,400mm.

There are two articulated vehicles currently operating with a capacity of 252 people and an empty vehicle weight of 30 tons.

=== 1958 - 2019 ===
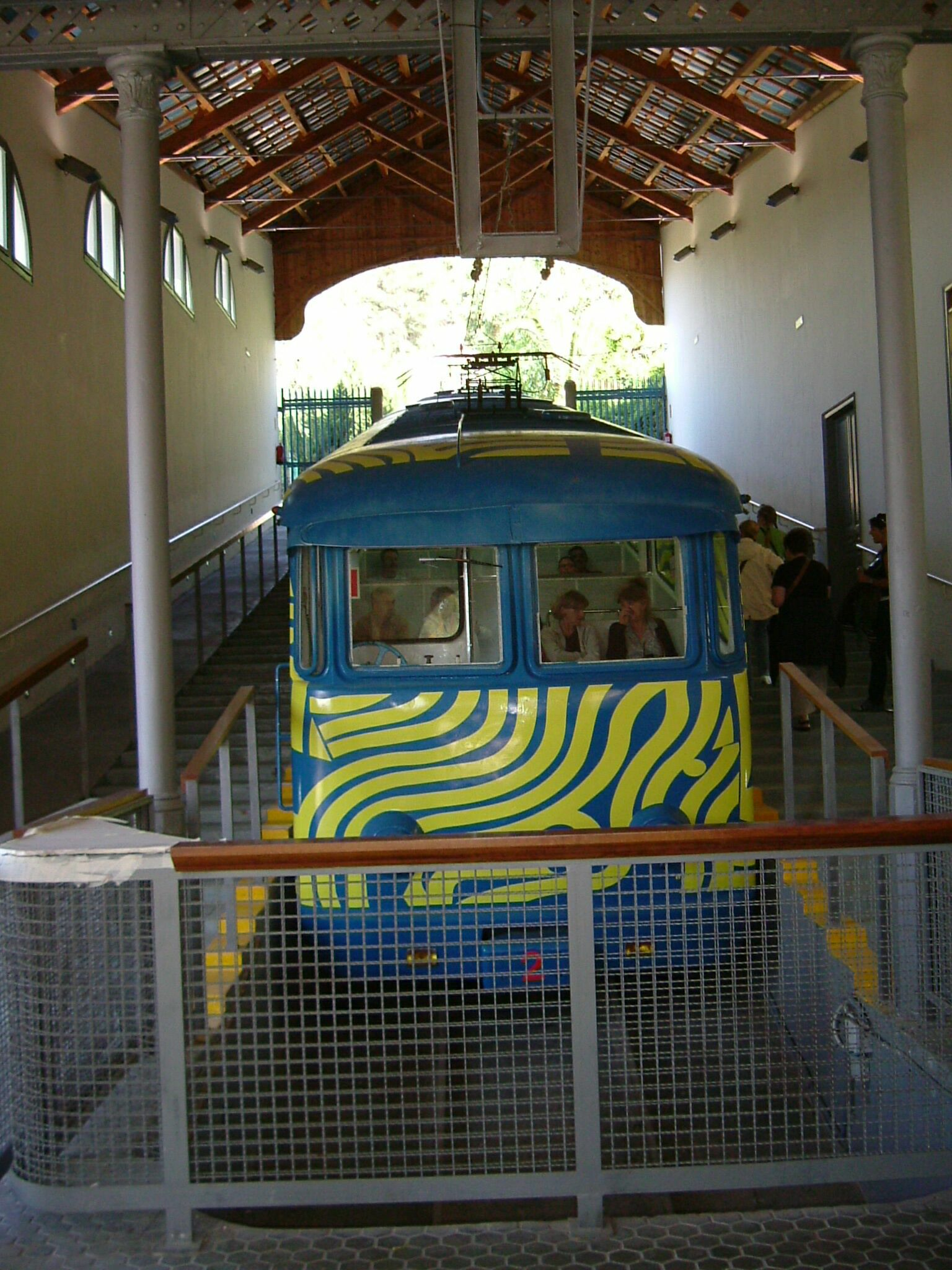
1958 - 2019 Car of the Funicular

The most notable change was the replacement of wooden bodies replaced by metal ones. They typically operated as 2-car trainsets carrying 113 per trainset with a maximum speed of 4.1metres per second (13.5 ft/s) with a track gauge of 1,000 mm (3 ft 3 3/8 in) metre gauge.

=== 1901 - 1958 ===
The vehicles had been remodelled multiple times over this period with cars made from wood. The first bodies were built by the Estrada de Sarrià workshops, and had five compartments divided between the preferential and general classes with a maximum capacity of 30 people.
