= Tibidabo =

Hill in Barcelona, Spain

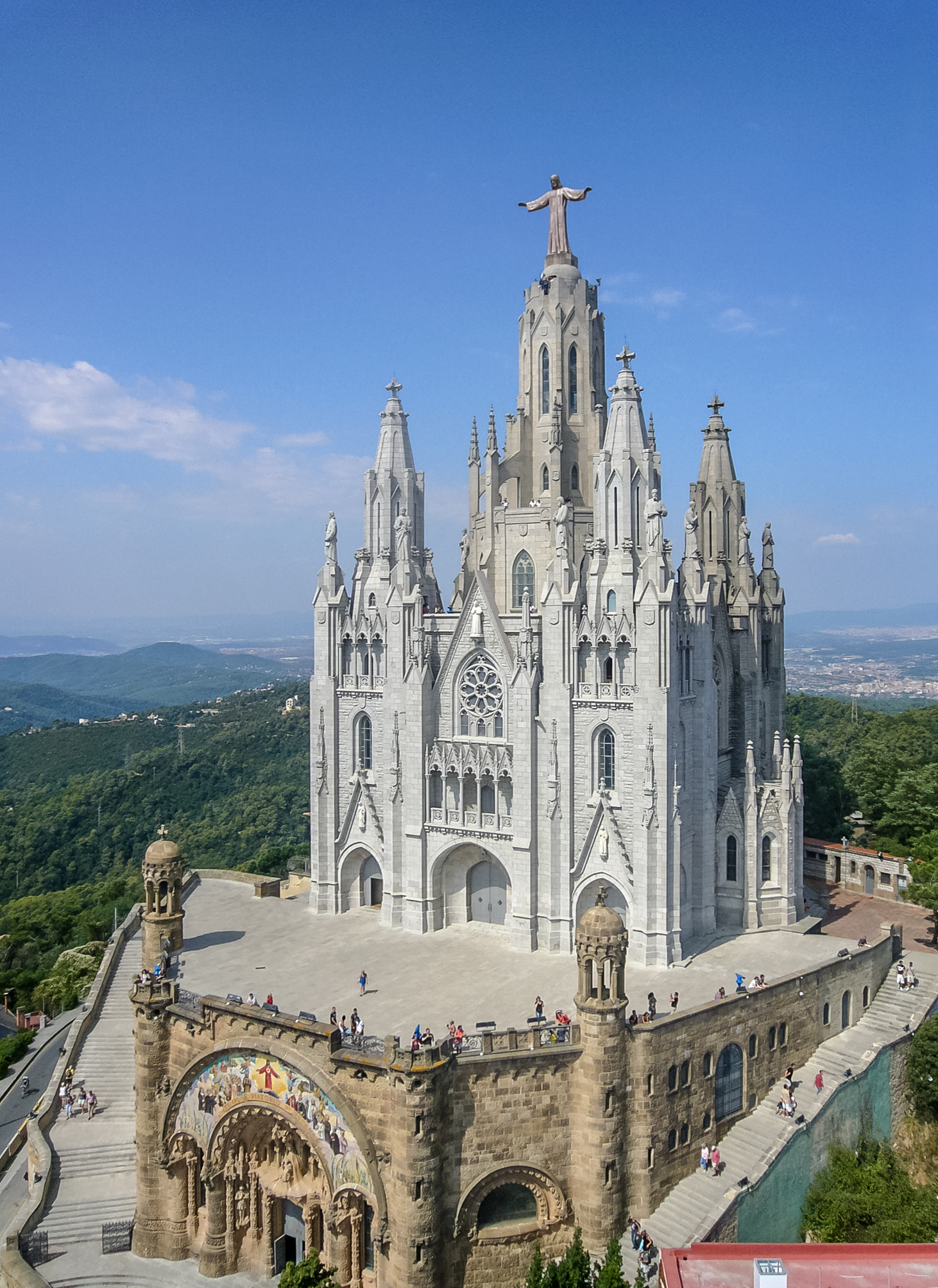
- Sagrat Cor church, atop the hill

Highest point
- Elevation: 512 m (1,680 ft)
- Coordinates: 41°25′21″N 2°07′07″E

Geography
- Location within Barcelona
- Location: Barcelona, Catalonia, Spain
- Parent range: Serra de Collserola

Climbing
- Easiest route: Tibidabo funicular railway

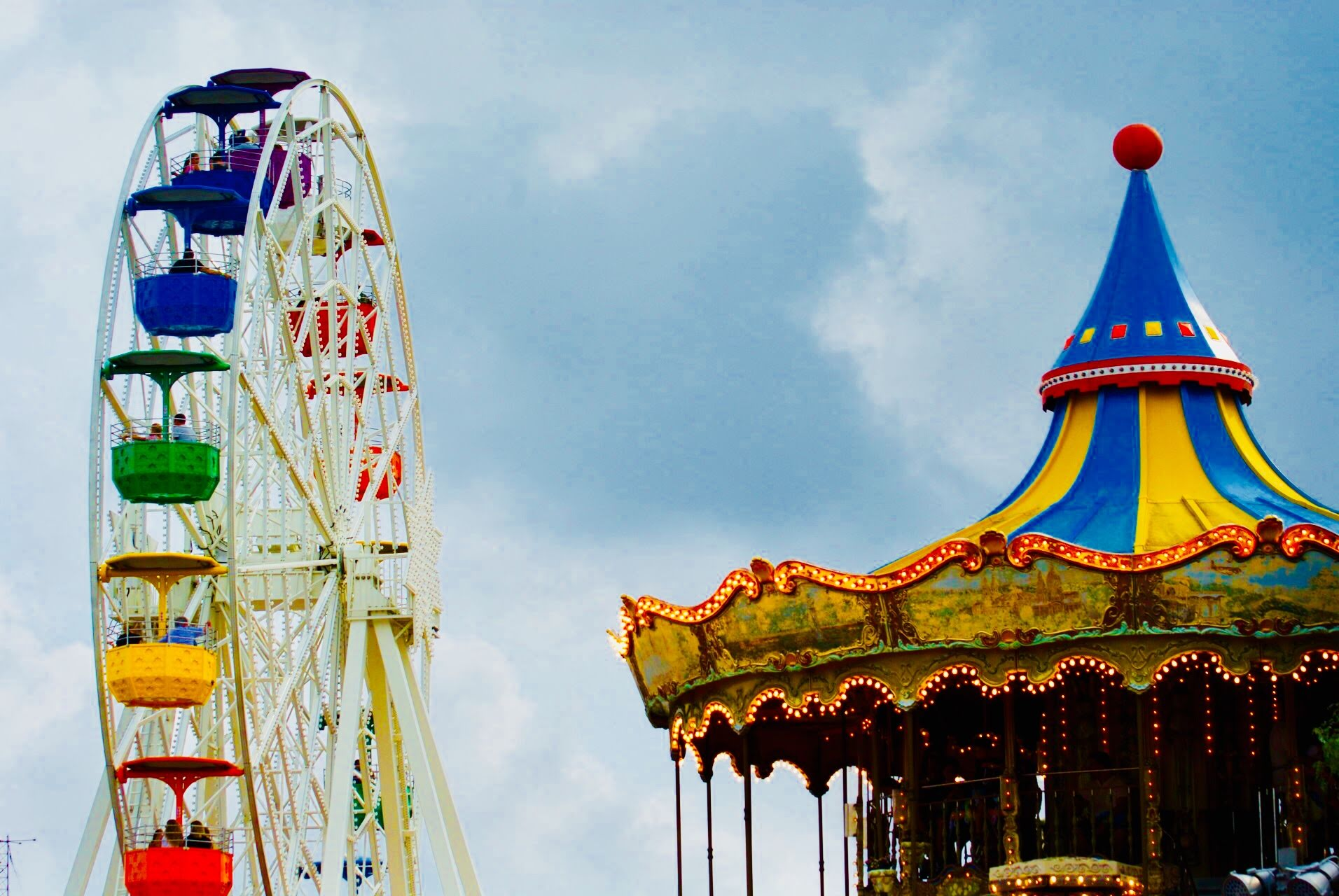
Tibidabo wheel

Tibidabo (Catalan pronunciation: [tiβiˈðaβu], Spanish pronunciation: [tiβiˈðaβo]) is a hill overlooking Barcelona, Catalonia, Spain. At 512 metres (1,680 ft), it is the tallest hill in the Serra de Collserola. Rising sharply to the north-west, it has views over the city and the surrounding coastline.

The summit of the hill is occupied by the Sagrat Cor church and adjacent Tibidabo Amusement Park. The Torre de Collserola telecommunications tower is a short walk away. All three are prominently visible from most of the city of Barcelona. Designed by Enric Sagnier, the church was started in 1902 and took 60 years to complete. It is topped by a sculpture of the Sacred Heart of Jesus by Josep Miret Llopart.

Tibidabo can be reached by road or via the Tibidabo Funicular, which was the first of its kind in Spain, and by the Tramvia Blau. Funicular operations recommenced in June 2021 after modernisation, however the tramway remains out of service. Replacement bus TC2 connects Tibidabo with Avinguda de Tibidabo Metro station. The Transports Metropolitans de Barcelona minibus service 111 connects it to Vallvidrera village and the upper station of the Vallvidrera funicular.

== Etymology ==
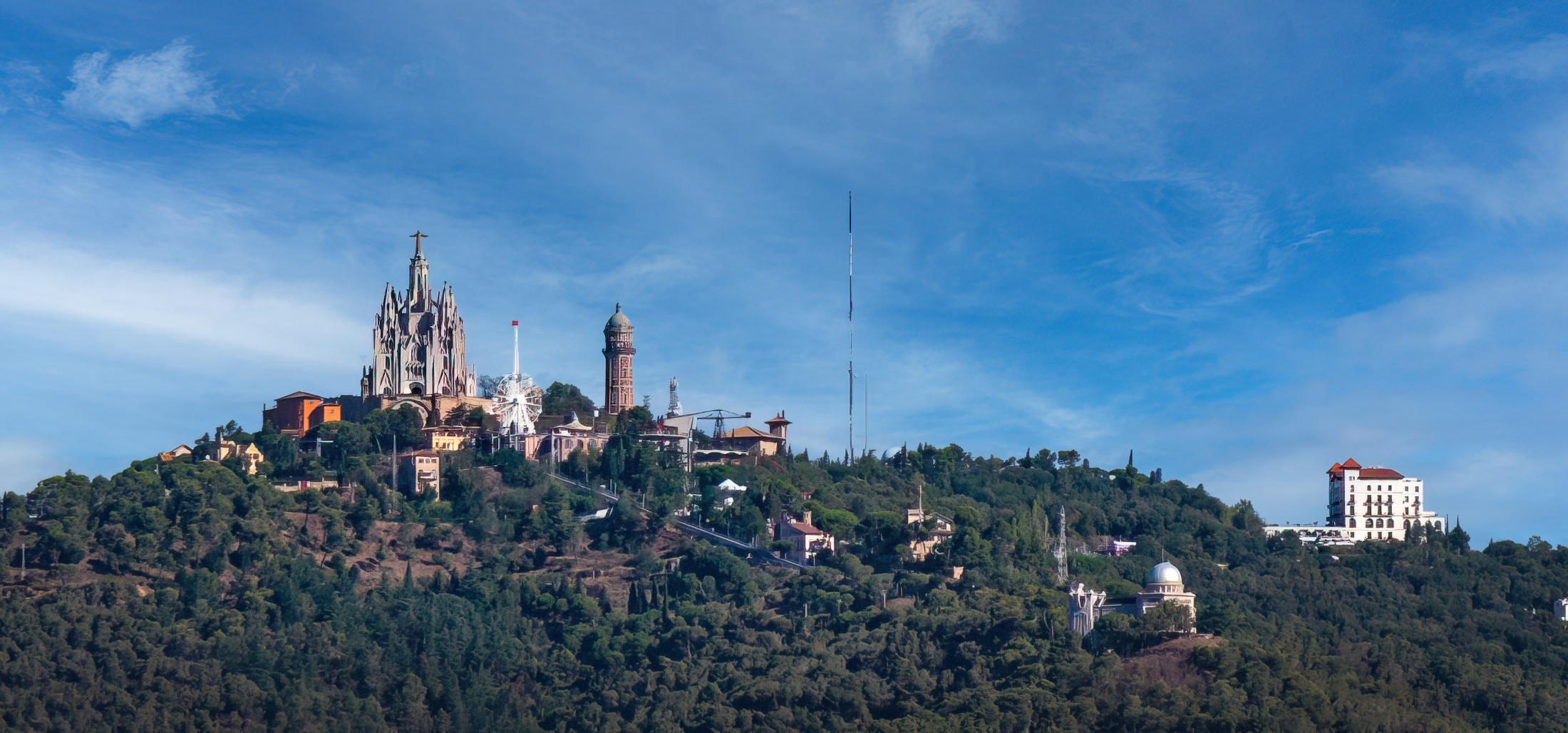
Skyline showing the church and amusement park

The name derives from several Latin Vulgate Bible verses:

- "…et dixit illi haec tibi omnia dabo si cadens adoraveris me" – "And saith unto him, All these things will I give thee, if thou wilt fall down and worship me" (Matthew 4:9);
- "…et ait ei tibi dabo potestatem hanc universam et gloriam illorum quia mihi tradita sunt et cui volo do illa" – "All this power will I give thee, and the glory of them: for that is delivered unto me; and to whomsoever I will I give it" (Luke 4:6).

These two Gospel passages, where the words mean "I will give to you", were said by the Devil in tempting Jesus as they were atop a high mountain and seeing "all the kingdoms of the world, and the glory of them". The name could reflect a folk belief identifying Barcelona’s hill with the biblical mountain, or more likely, it is simply a tongue in cheek transferral of this action to Barcelona, just to indicate how glorious and tempting Barcelona could be.

The other phrase containing Tibi dabo is a quote from Matthew 16:18, wherein Jesus calls Saint Peter “the Rock” and gives him the Keys of Heaven. Cited as a foundation for Petrine Primacy, the verse is inscribed within the tholobate of the main dome above the apostle’s tomb in St. Peter's Basilica, Vatican City.

== Panorama ==
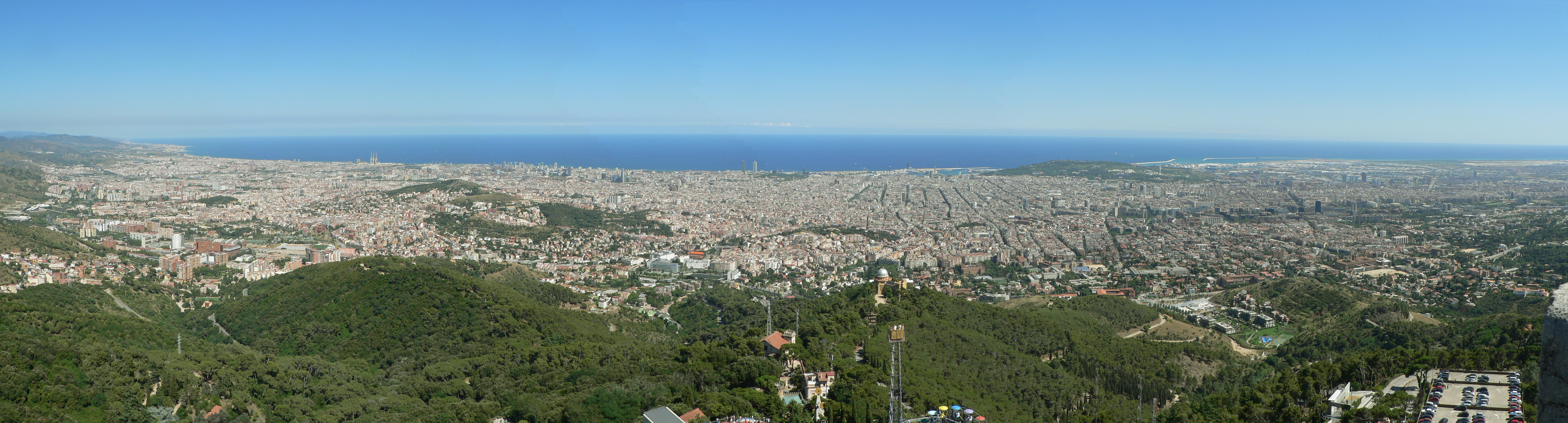
A panoramic view of Barcelona from Tibidabo

== See also ==
- Casino Internacional Tibidabo
- List of mountains in Catalonia
- The Shadow of the Wind
- Urban planning of Barcelona
