= Casino Internacional Tibidabo =

Resort in Barcelona, Spain

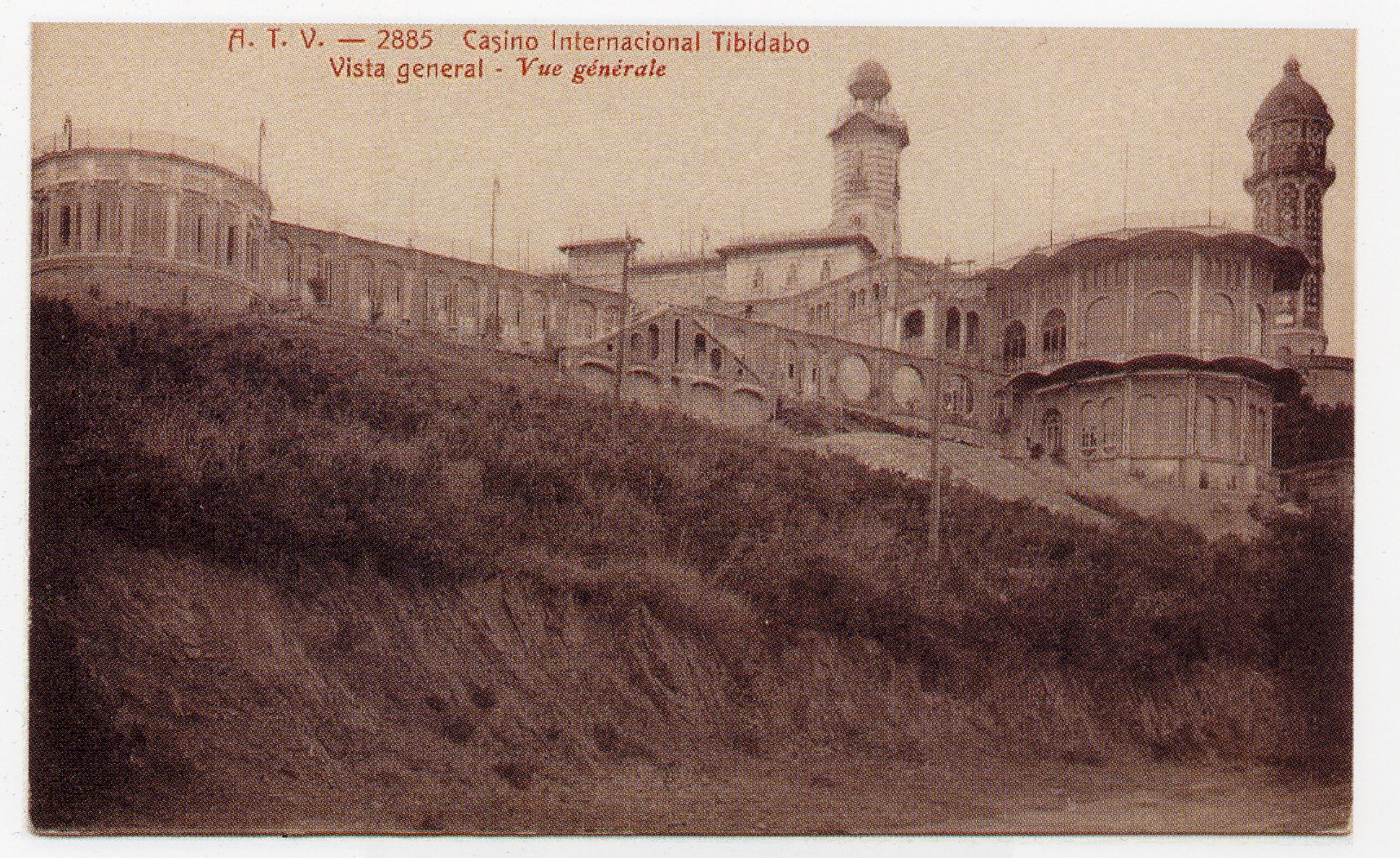
View of the building

The Casino Internacional Tibidabo was a resort created in 1909 in Barcelona on the Tibidabo mountain. The building had a gaming room, theatre, and bar. The games of chance offered were klondyke, roulette and baccarat. Although gambling was forbidden by law in Spain, the casino operated for three years until the government closed it down in 1912. Today the casino is part of an amusement park. The automatons museum occupies the premises of the old theatre.

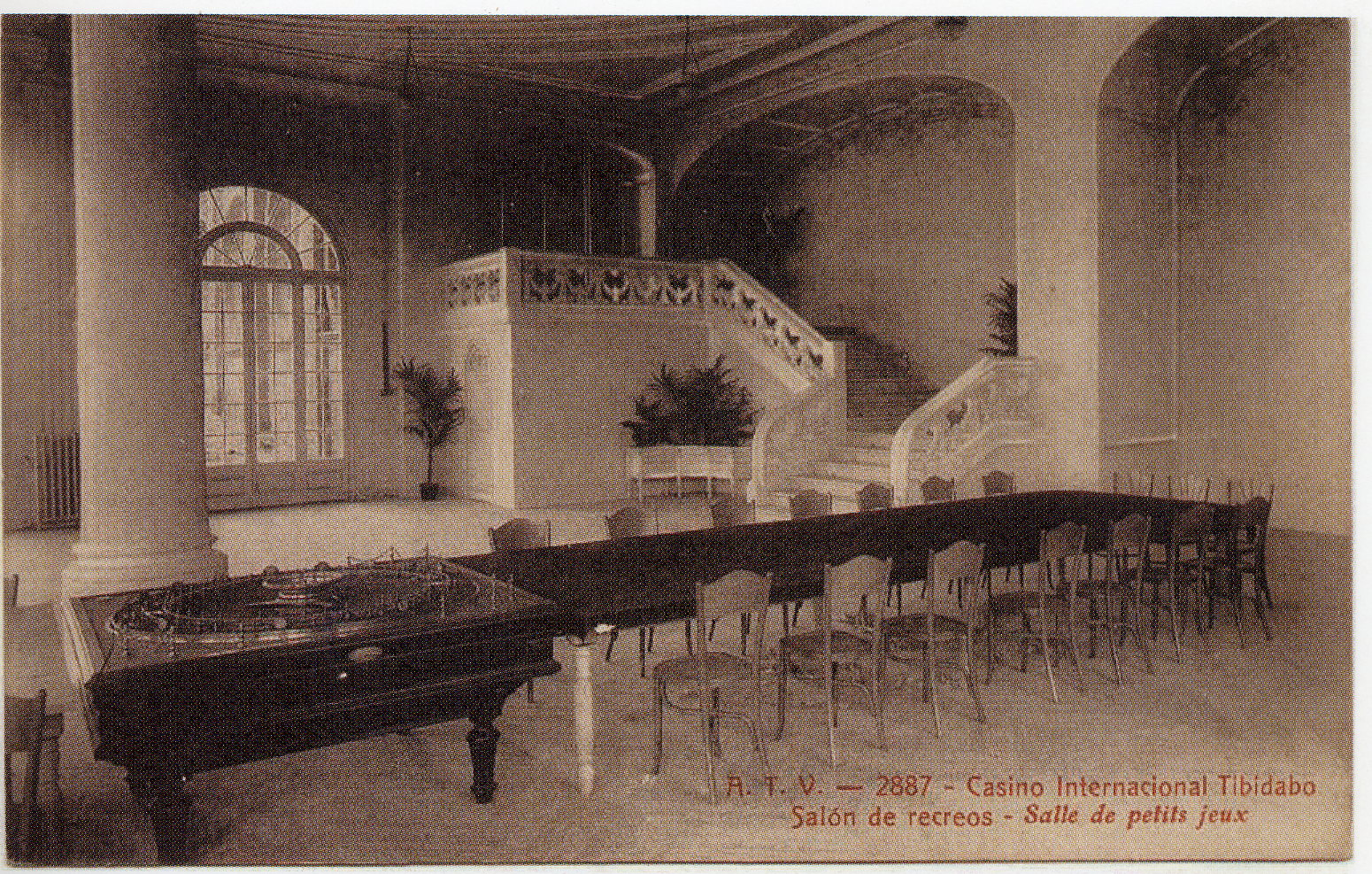
Roulette table at the casino
