= Temple Expiatori del Sagrat Cor =

Church in Barcelona, Spain

Expiatory Church of the Sacred Heart of Jesus Temple Expiatori del Sagrat Cor Basilica Templo Expiatorio del Sagrado Corazón de Jesús
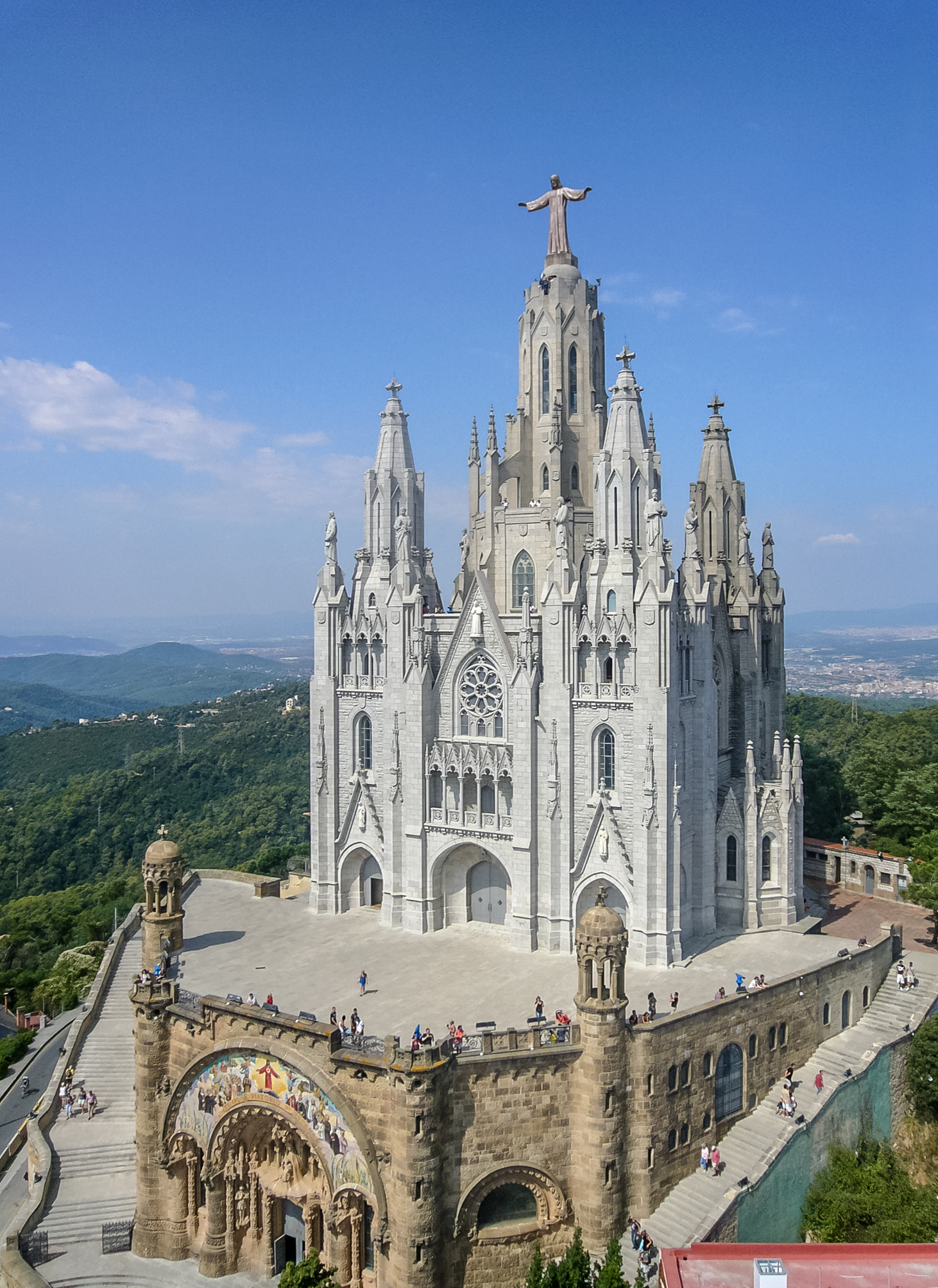
- Entrance of the basilica

Religion
- Affiliation: Roman Catholic
- Ecclesiastical or organisational status: parish church, minor basilica
- Year consecrated: 1952

Location
- Location: Barcelona, Catalonia, Spain
- Interactive map of Expiatory Church of the Sacred Heart of Jesus; Temple Expiatori del Sagrat Cor; Basilica Templo Expiatorio del Sagrado Corazón de Jesús
- Coordinates: 41°25′19.47″N 2°7′7.9″E

Architecture
- Architect: Enric Sagnier
- Type: Church
- Style: Neo Gothic
- Groundbreaking: 1902
- Completed: 1961

Specifications
- Direction of façade: S
- Length: 60 metres (200 ft)
- Width: 70 metres (230 ft)
- Spire: 5

Website
- templotibidabo.es

The Temple Expiatori del Sagrat Cor (Catalan pronunciation: [səˈɣɾat ˈkɔɾ]; English: Expiatory Church of the Sacred Heart of Jesus; Spanish: Templo Expiatorio del Sagrado Corazón de Jesús) is a Roman Catholic church and minor basilica located on the summit of Mount Tibidabo in Barcelona, Catalonia, Spain. The building is the work of the Catalan architect Enric Sagnier and was completed by his son Josep Maria Sagnier i Vidal. The construction of the church, dedicated to the Sacred Heart of Jesus, lasted from 1902 to 1961.

== History ==
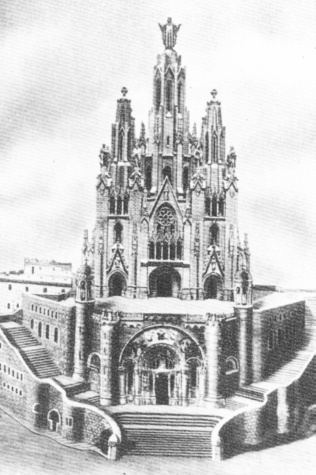
A model of the church

The idea of building a Catholic church on the summit of the Tibidabo emerged in the late 19th century amidst rumors about the construction of a Protestant church and a hotel-casino at that location. This motivated a "Board of Catholic Knights" to acquire the ownership of the field and give it to Saint John Bosco in 1886, when he was visiting Barcelona at the invitation of Dorotea de Chopitea, a great patron and promoter of the project. From this arose the idea of a building dedicated to the Sacred Heart of Jesus, a dedication very popular at that time thanks to the impetus given by Pope Leo XIII, and following in line with the church built in Rome by Bosco himself (Sacro Cuore di Gesù a Castro Pretorio) and the famous Sacré-Cœur in Paris.

In 1886 a neo-Gothic hermitage was built, and two years later, for the Universal Exposition, the Vallvidrera road was urbanized and a pavilion of Mudejar inspiration was built beside the hermitage to serve as a viewing point (for the city below). However, the project to build the church suffered a significant delay mainly because of the development of a new project to build an astronomical observatory on the summit of Tibidabo, which was eventually constructed on a nearby hill (Fabra Observatory). Finally, on 28 December 1902, the first stone was placed in a ceremony presided by the Bishop of Barcelona, Salvador Casañas i Pagès.

The crypt was built between 1903 and 1911, and the main church was built between 1915 and 1951. The church was consecrated by Bishop Gregorio Modrego Casaus during the 35th Eucharistic Congress held in Barcelona in 1952. The towers were completed afterward, with work officially ending in 1961. On 29 October 1961 the church received the title of minor basilica from Pope John XXIII.

== Exterior ==
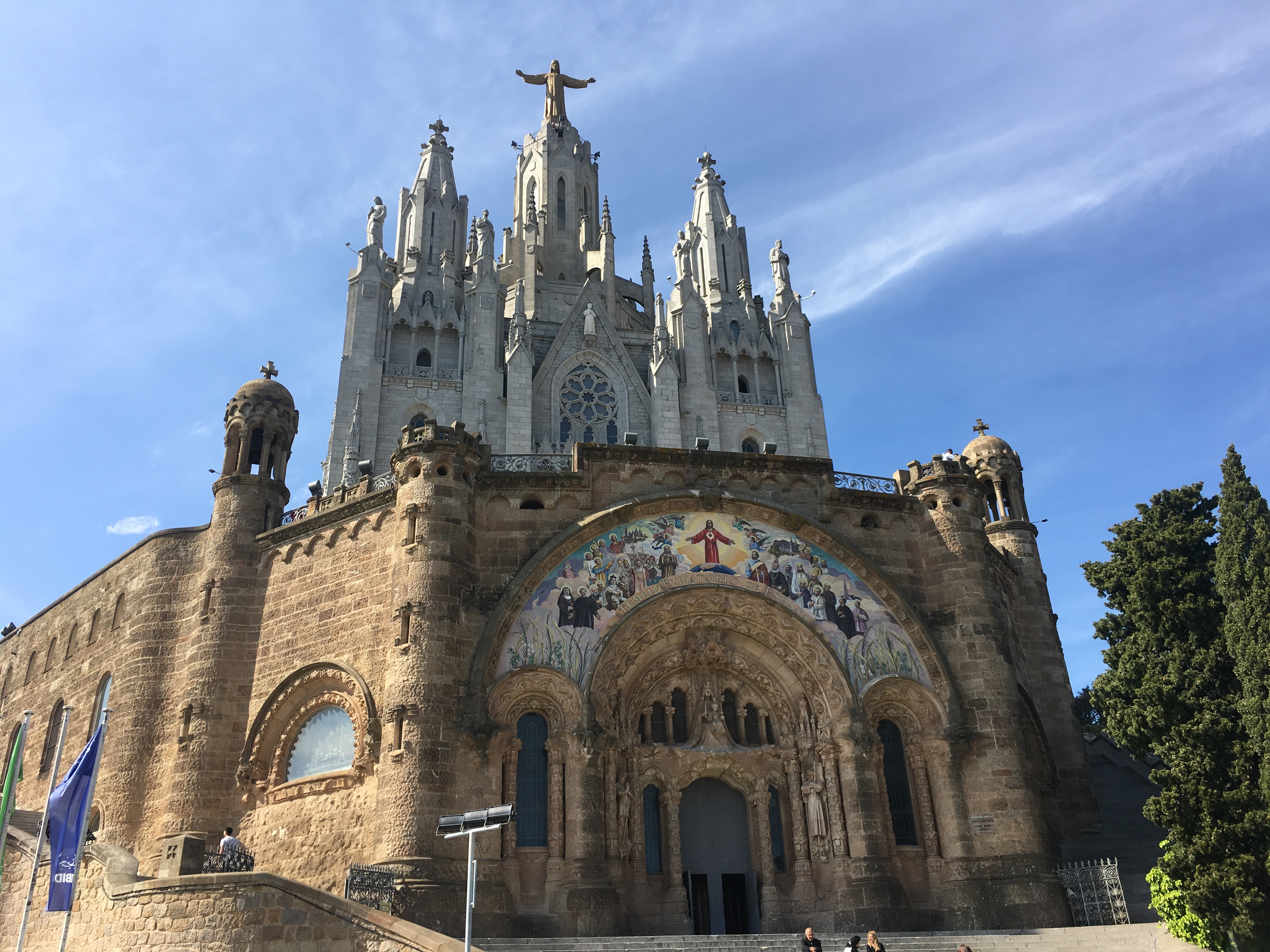
Facade of the crypt

The external appearance of the church is of a Romanesque fortress of stone from Montjuïc (the crypt), topped by a monumental neo-Gothic church accessed by two grand outdoor stairways. The upper church has a central floor with an octagonal dome on eight columns. The dome is crowned with an image of the Sacred Heart; the original work was by Frederic Marès (destroyed in 1936) and replaced in 1950 with another by Josep Miret.

The upper church is square with three apses, a large central tower, and four lower towers marking the four corners of the square, and statues of the Twelve Apostles sculpted by Josep Miret. The main facade has three sections, the central wider, chaired by the figure of the Archangel Michael in the arch of the main entrance, and John Bosco in the pediment above. Over the left door is the statue of Teresa of Ávila and over the right, Marguerite Marie Alacoque. Above the door is an open gallery of arches with tracery.

The façade of the crypt has a richly decorated tympanum with sculptures by Alfons Juyol i Bach following the design of Eusebi Arnau. The sculptures represent the Virgin of Mercy, Saint George, and Saint James, the patron saints of Barcelona, Catalonia, and Spain, respectively. The crypt facade consists of three semicircular arches on columns, inserted under a larger semicircular arch, originally decorated with a mosaic of the Holy Trinity by Daniel Zuloaga (destroyed in 1936). In 1955 it was redecorated by the Bru Workshop of Barcelona; the work depicts an allegory of the devotion of Spain, represented by its patron saints.

== Interior ==
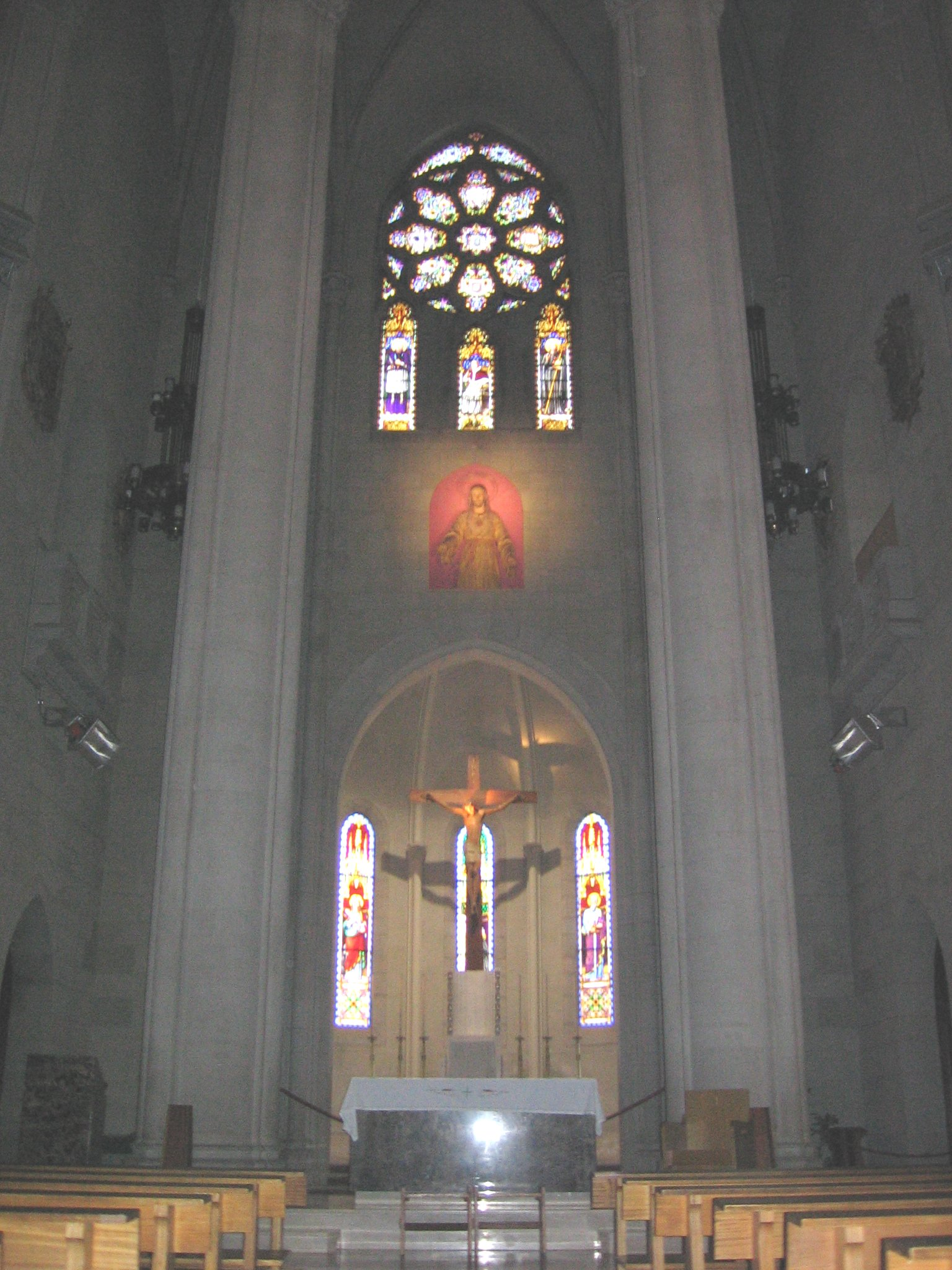
Inside the temple

The interior is divided into a nave and two aisles with semicircular apses, with stained glasses and four rose windows on the facades. In the main altar stands the great crucifix, a work by Joan Puigdollers. The windows of the presbytery are dedicated to Pius X, John the Evangelist, Marguerite Marie Alacoque, Paul the Apostle and John Bosco. The left altar has five stained glasses dedicated to various Marian devotions: the Virgin of Antipolo (Philippines), Our Lady of Luján (Argentina), the Assumption of Mary, Our Lady of Guadalupe (Mexico) and Our Lady of Charity (Cuba). The right altar is presided by the Risen Jesus, a work by Joan Puigdollers, and its stained glasses are dedicated to Spanish Marian devotions: the Virgin of Almudena (Madrid), the Virgin of Núria (Catalonia), Our Lady of Hope, Our Lady of the Forsaken (Valencia) and Our Lady of Begoña (Basque Country).

The windows of the four towers contain the Latin phrase tibi dabo ("I'll give you"), the name of the mountain. At the level of the choir include founding saints: Marcellin Champagnat and Jean-Baptiste de La Salle on both sides of the presbytery, and Anthony Mary Claret, Joseph Calasanctius, John Bosco and Maria Domenica Mazzarello next to the main facade. The windows of the four facades are dedicated to Francis de Sales, Pius XI, Ignatius of Loyola, Francisco Javier, Pius IX, Rose of Lima, Leo XIII and Pius XII. The eight stained glasses of the dome depict scenes from the life of Jesus.

== Statue of Jesus ==
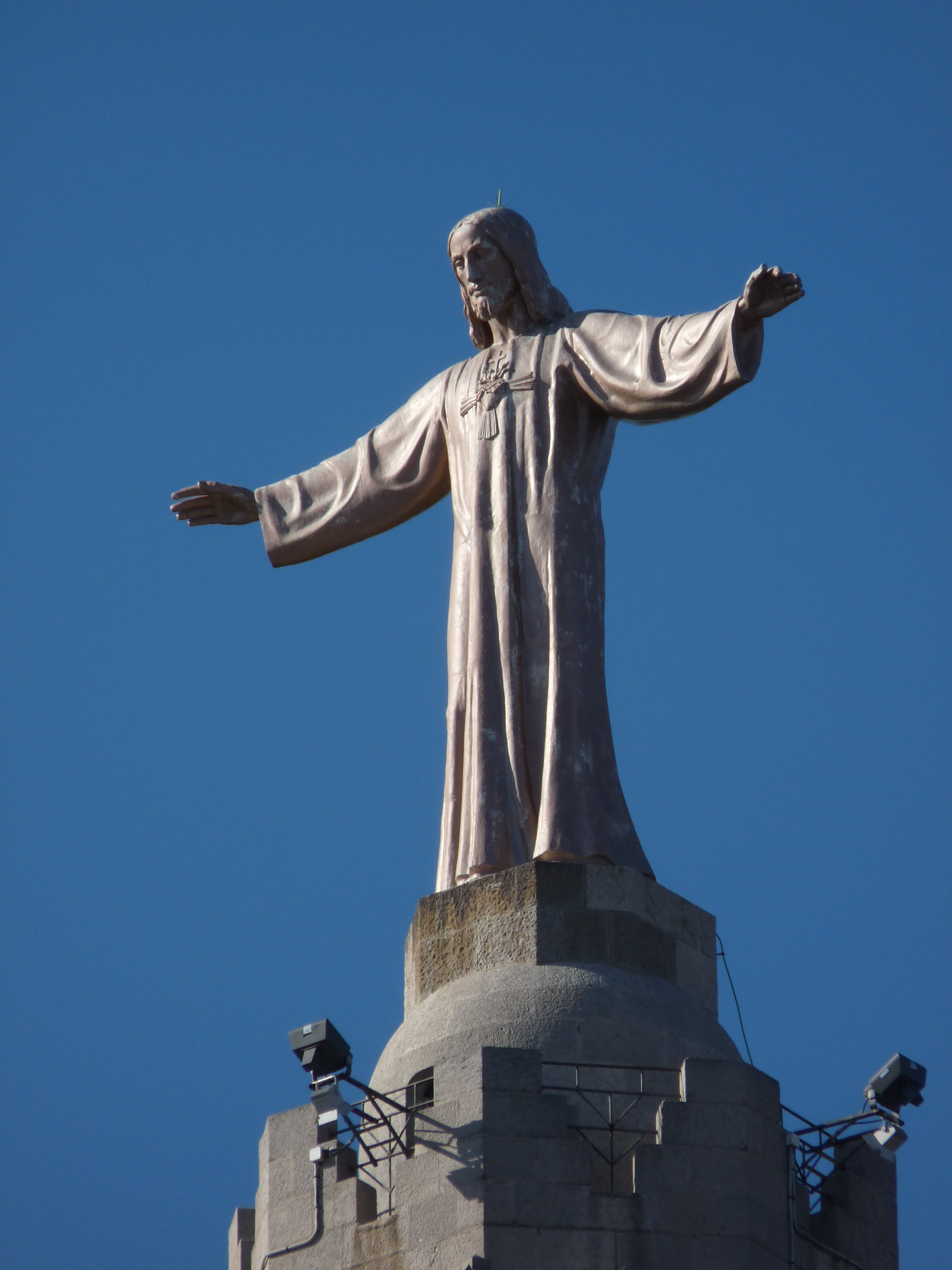
Statue of Jesus on the top of Sagrat Cor.

The church is crowned by the enormous bronze statue of the Sacred Heart made by Josep Miret in 1950. It replaced the original by Frederic Marès, which was made in 1935 and destroyed the following year as the Spanish Civil War began. The ascent from the crypt, passing through the church and ending at the sculpture, reflects the rise and the purification of the human condition by means of sacrifice and atonement.

== Crypt ==
The crypt was designed in a neo-Byzantine style, combining Gothic and classical elements, and decoration close to Modernisme. The space of the crypt consists of five naves separated by columns, the central one being wider, all with semicircular apses. The walls and vaults are lined with alabaster or decorated with mosaics, with scenes relating to the dedications of the altars: Mary Help of Christians, Saint Anthony of Padua, the Blessed Sacrament, Saint Joseph, and the Virgin of Montserrat.

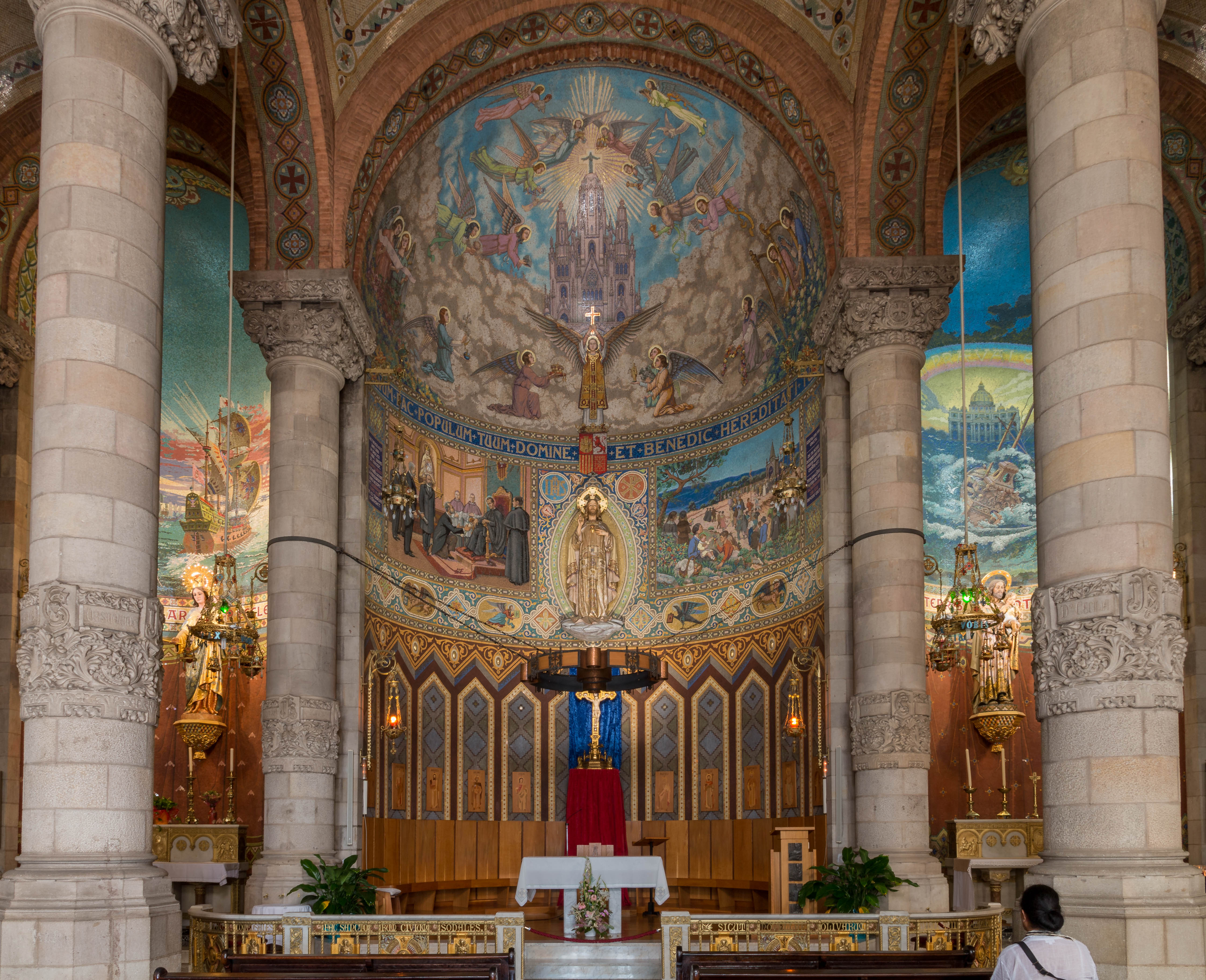
Inside the crypt

Polychrome alabaster is also used for the Via Crucis (Stations of the Cross) sculpted by Josep Miret. The windows that bring natural light inside are complemented by stained glass windows with the following topics: the largest in the arch, in the corners, represent the appearance of the Our Lady of the Pillar and the conversion of King Reccared I to Catholicism; Saint Ferdinand and Saint Hermenegild are represented in the two large vertical windows; and the small ones located above the door are dedicated to Joachim, Isidore the Farmer, Saint Anthony and Saint Elizabeth of Portugal.

From the crypt there is access to a chapel dedicated to the Perpetual Adoration, excavated into the mountain in the late 1940s, consisting of three naves divided by columns. The interior is decorated with marble, mosaics in the pavement, and paintings by Miquel Farré i Albagés in the vaults, made between 1947 and 1949.

Outside of the crypt, on either side of the main door, are two staircases leading to the level of the temple itself.

== Gallery ==
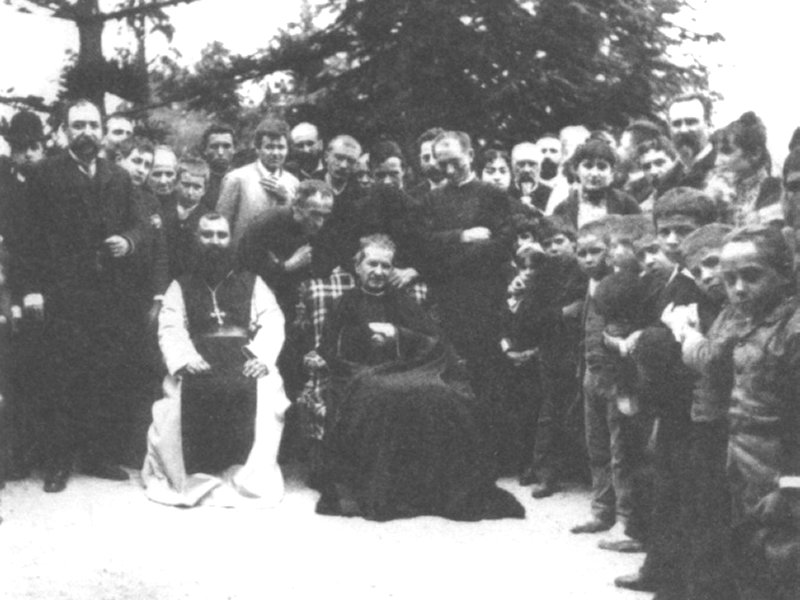
Saint John Bosco during his visit to Barcelona in 1886.

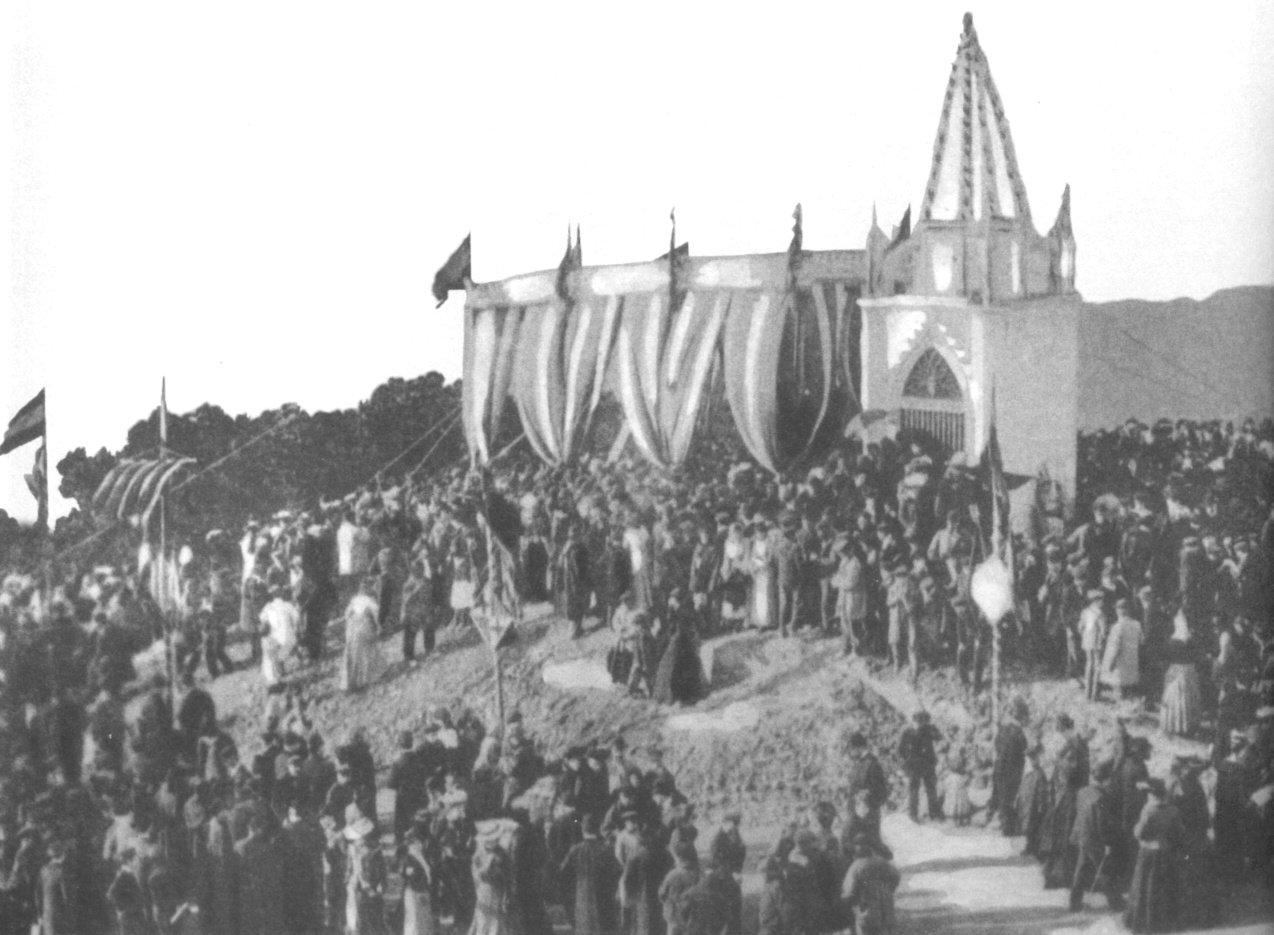
Laying the foundation stone (12–28–1902).

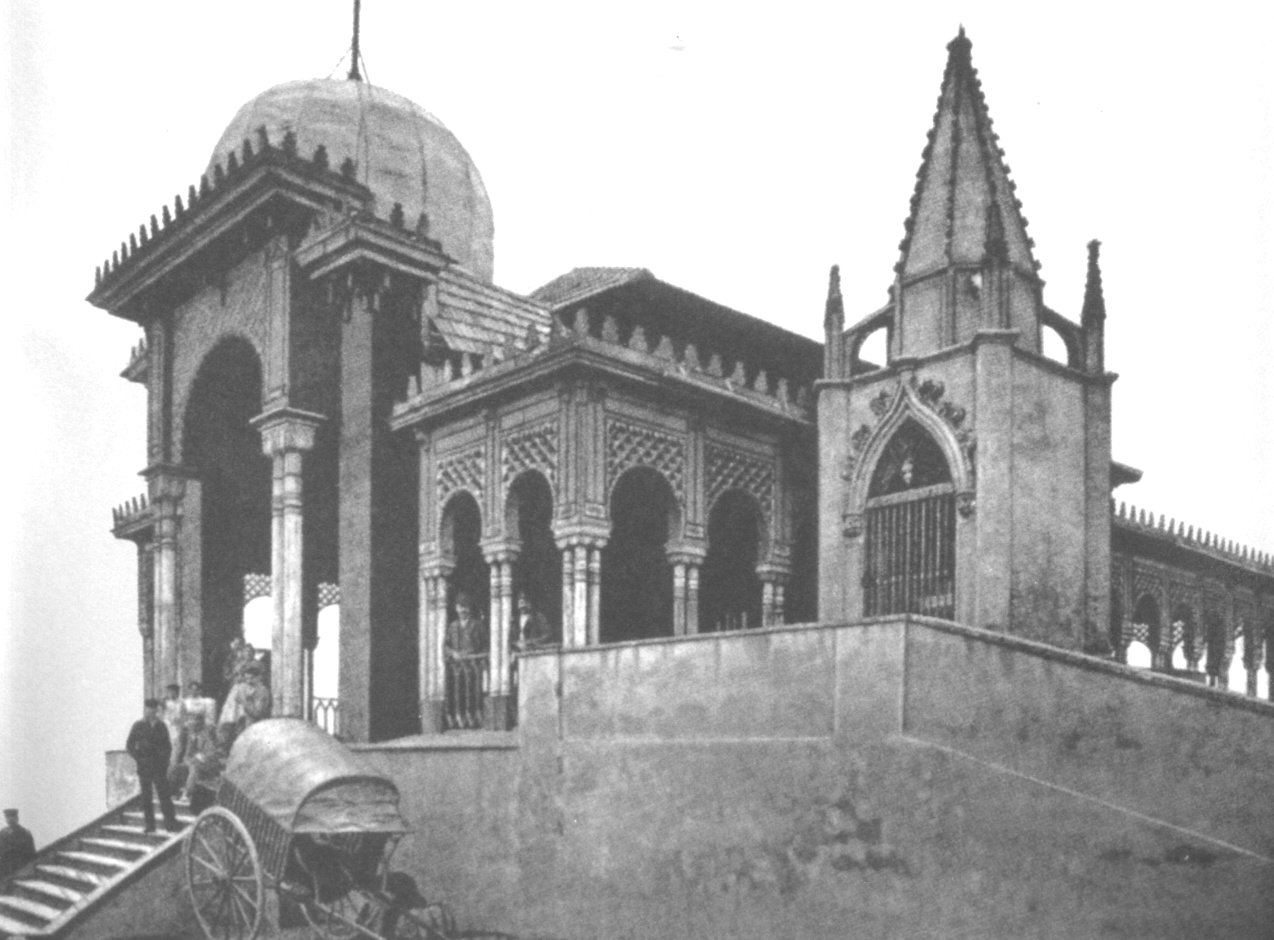
Mudéjar pavilion for the 1888 Universal Exposition (next to the hermitage).

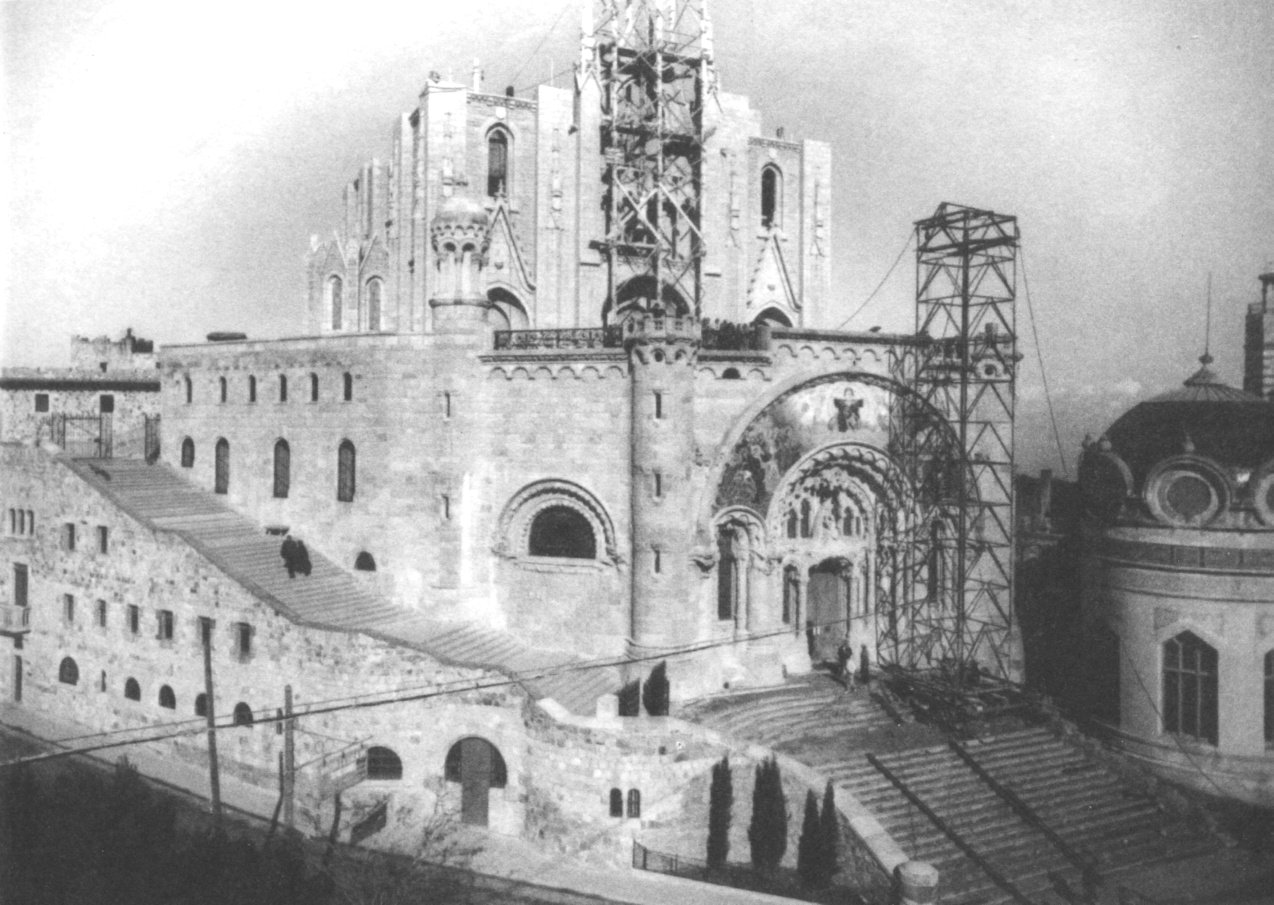
The Sagrat Cor in 1931.

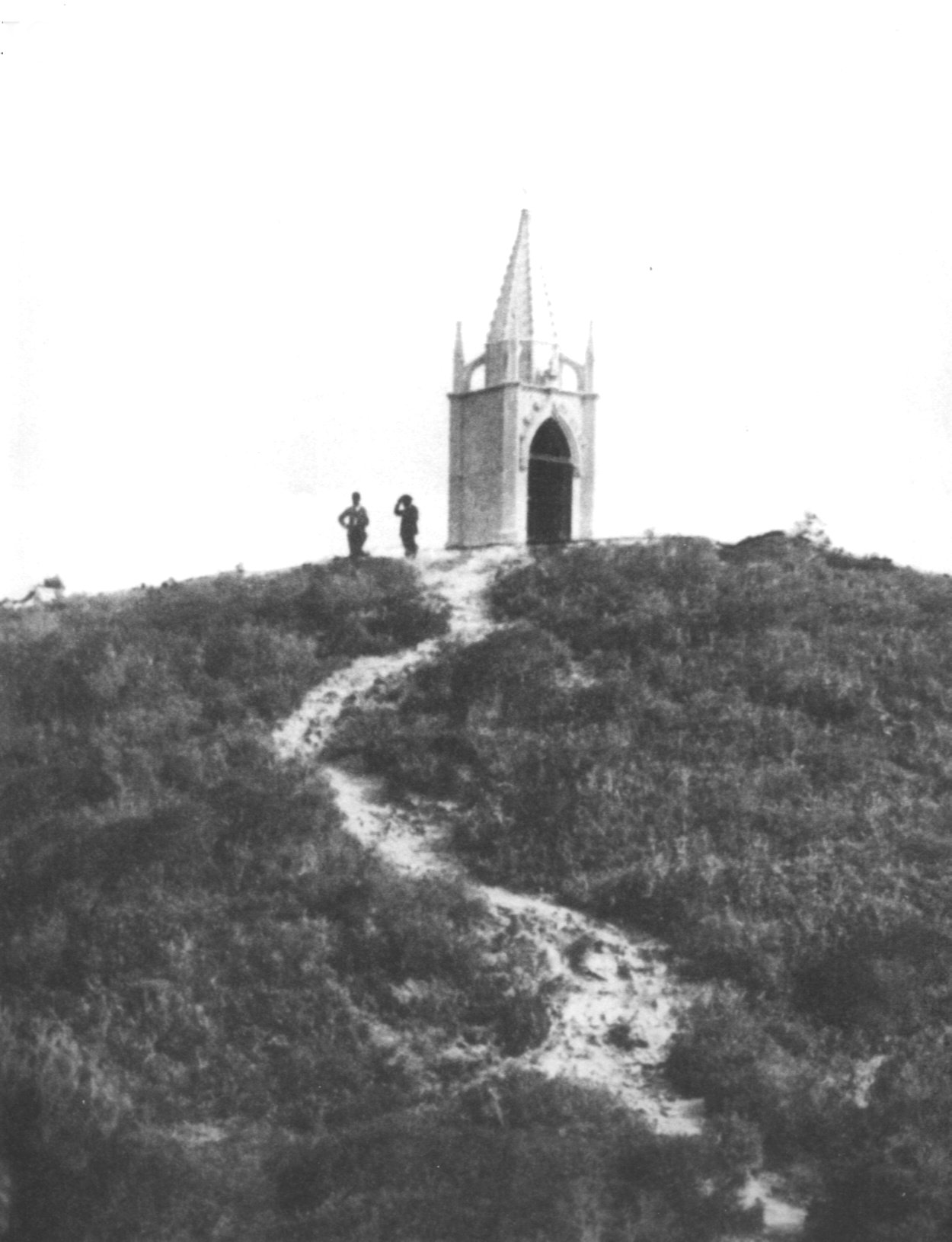
The hermitage in 1902, before building the temple.

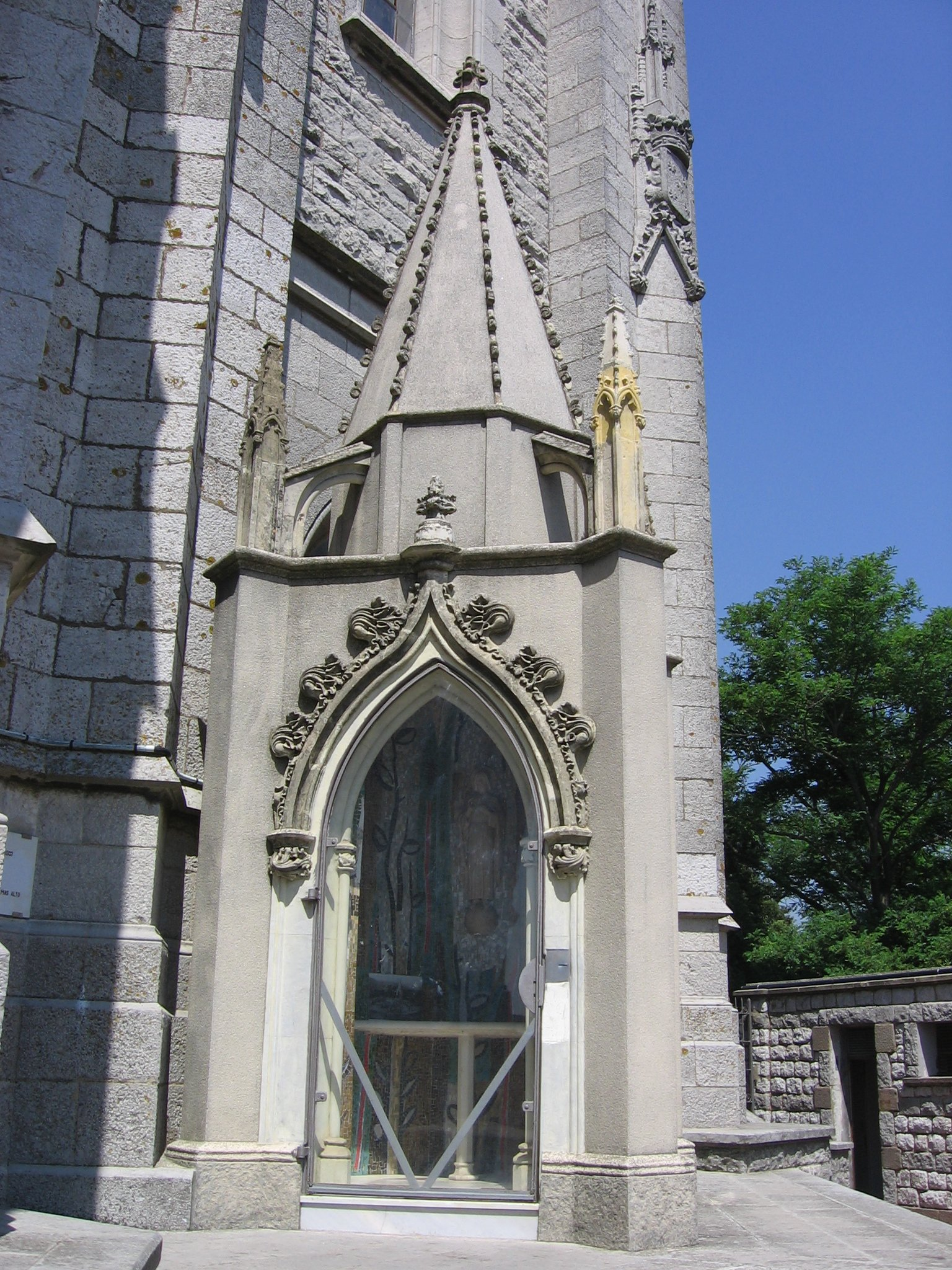
The hermitage today, integrated in the temple.

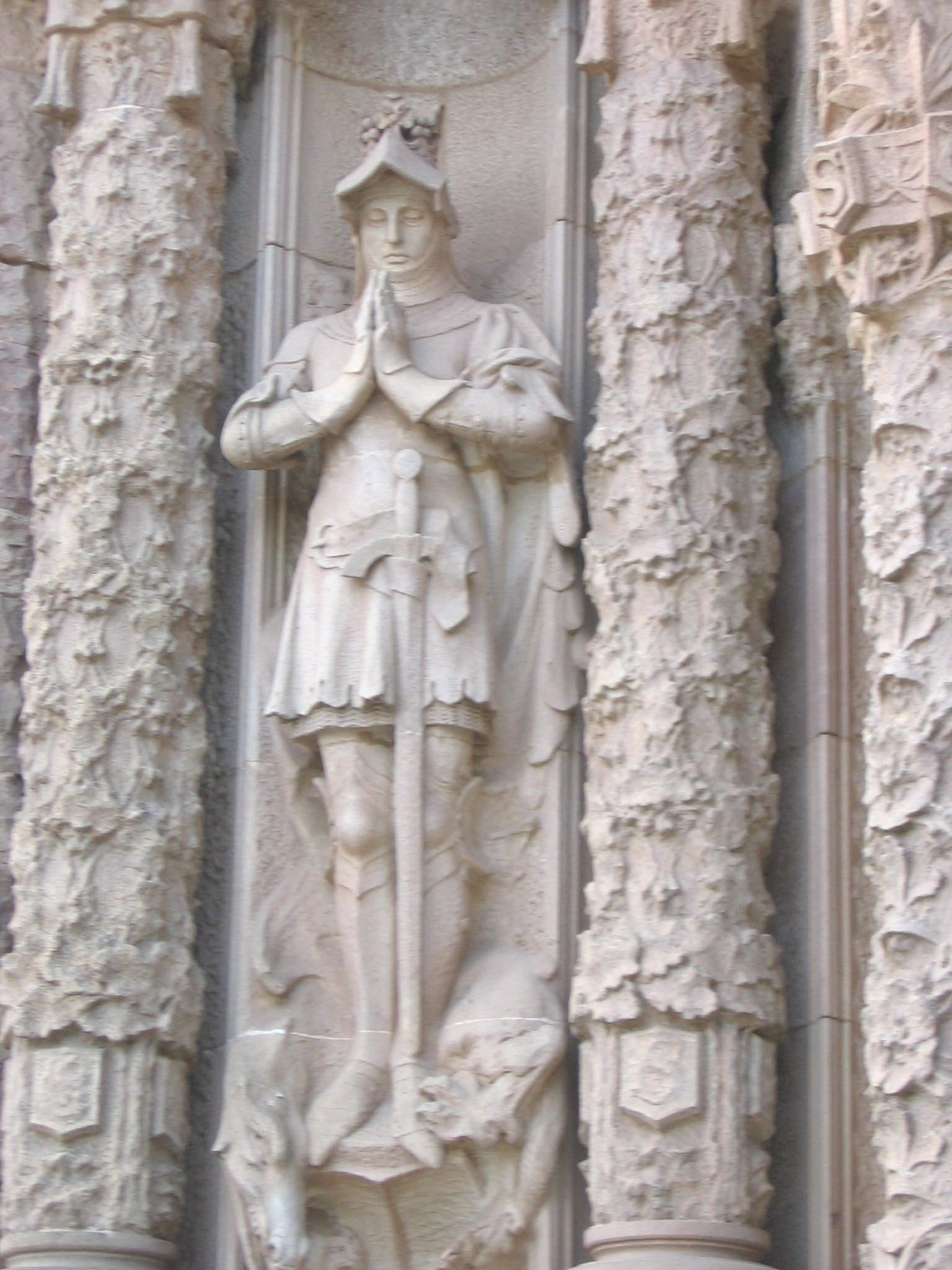

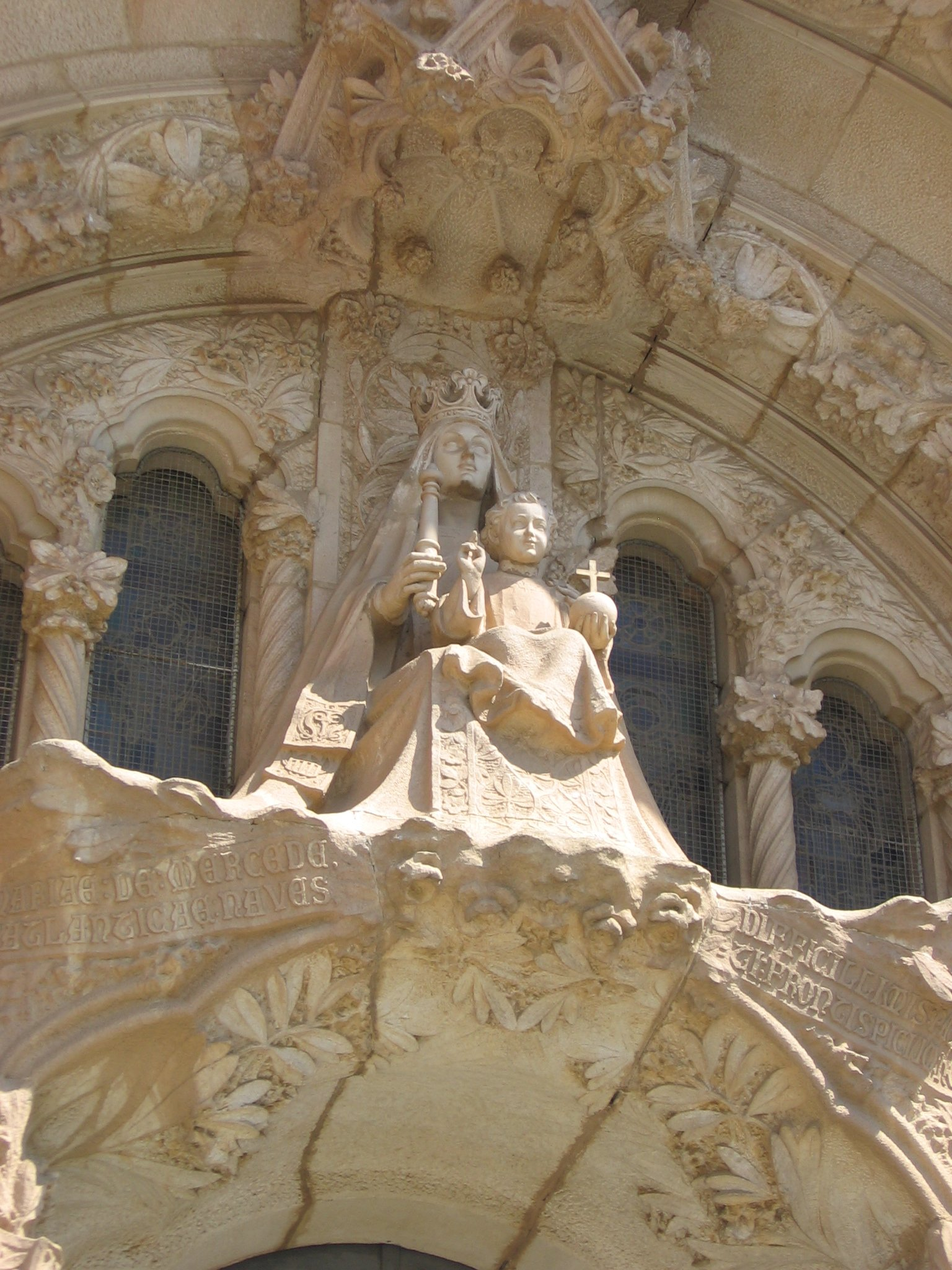

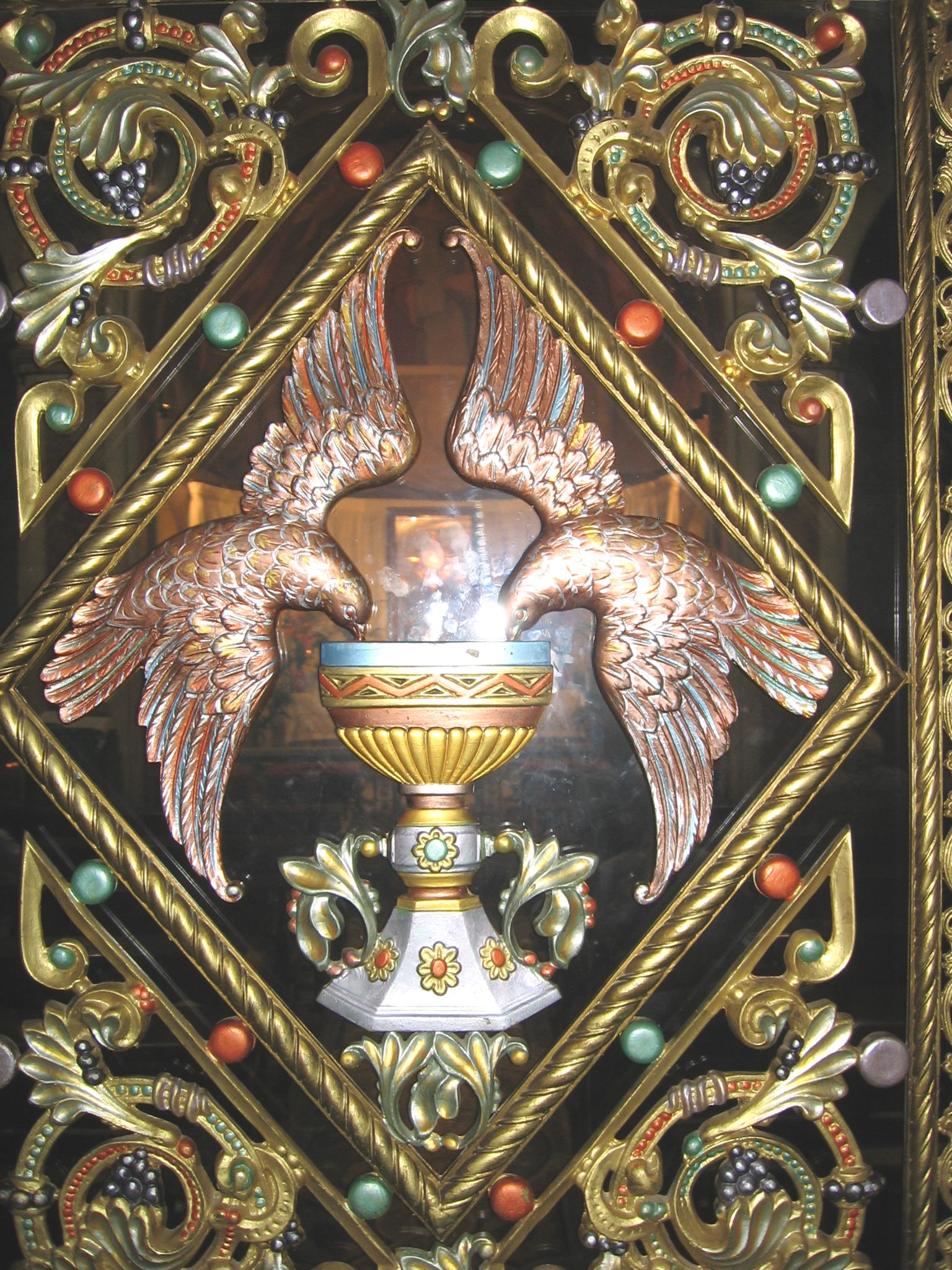

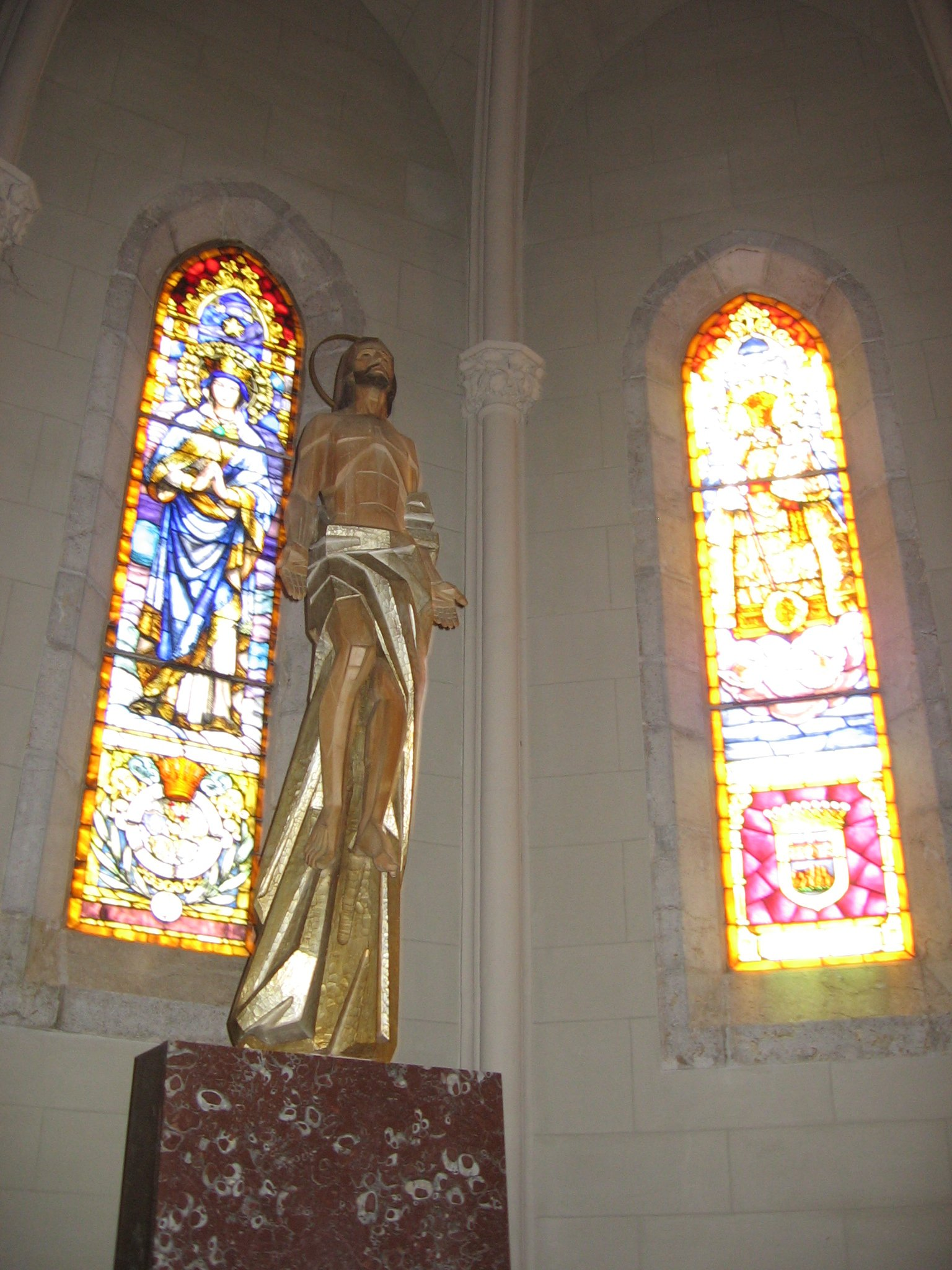

== Bibliography ==
- Modernisme I Modernistes. Barcelona: Lunwerg. 2001. ISBN 84-7782-776-1.
- Barjau, Santi (1992). Enric Sagnier (in Catalan). Barcelona: Labor. ISBN 84-335-4802-6.
- Barral i Altet, Xavier (1999). Art de Catalunya. Arquitectura religiosa moderna i contemporània (in Catalan). Barcelona: L'isard. ISBN 84-89931-14-3.
- Fontbona, Francesc; Miralles, Francesc (1985). Història de l'Art Català. Del modernisme al noucentisme (1888-1917) (in Catalan). Barcelona: Ed. 62. ISBN 84-297-2282-3.
- Lacuesta, Raquel (2006). Modernisme a L'entorn de Barcelona (in Catalan). Barcelona: Diputació de Barcelona. ISBN 84-9803-158-3.
- Navascués Palacio, Pedro (1993). Summa Artis. Arquitectura Española, 1808-1914 (in Spanish). Cantoblanco (Madrid): Espasa-Calpe. ISBN 84-239-5477-3.
- Permanyer, Lluís (1993). Barcelona modernista (in Catalan). Barcelona: Ed. Polígrafa. ISBN 84-343-0723-5.

== See also ==
- Enric Sagnier
- Modernisme
- The model of this church in Catalunya en Miniatura.
