= Tramvia Blau =

Tram system in Barcelona, Spain

Coordinates: 41.414201°N 2.134073°E

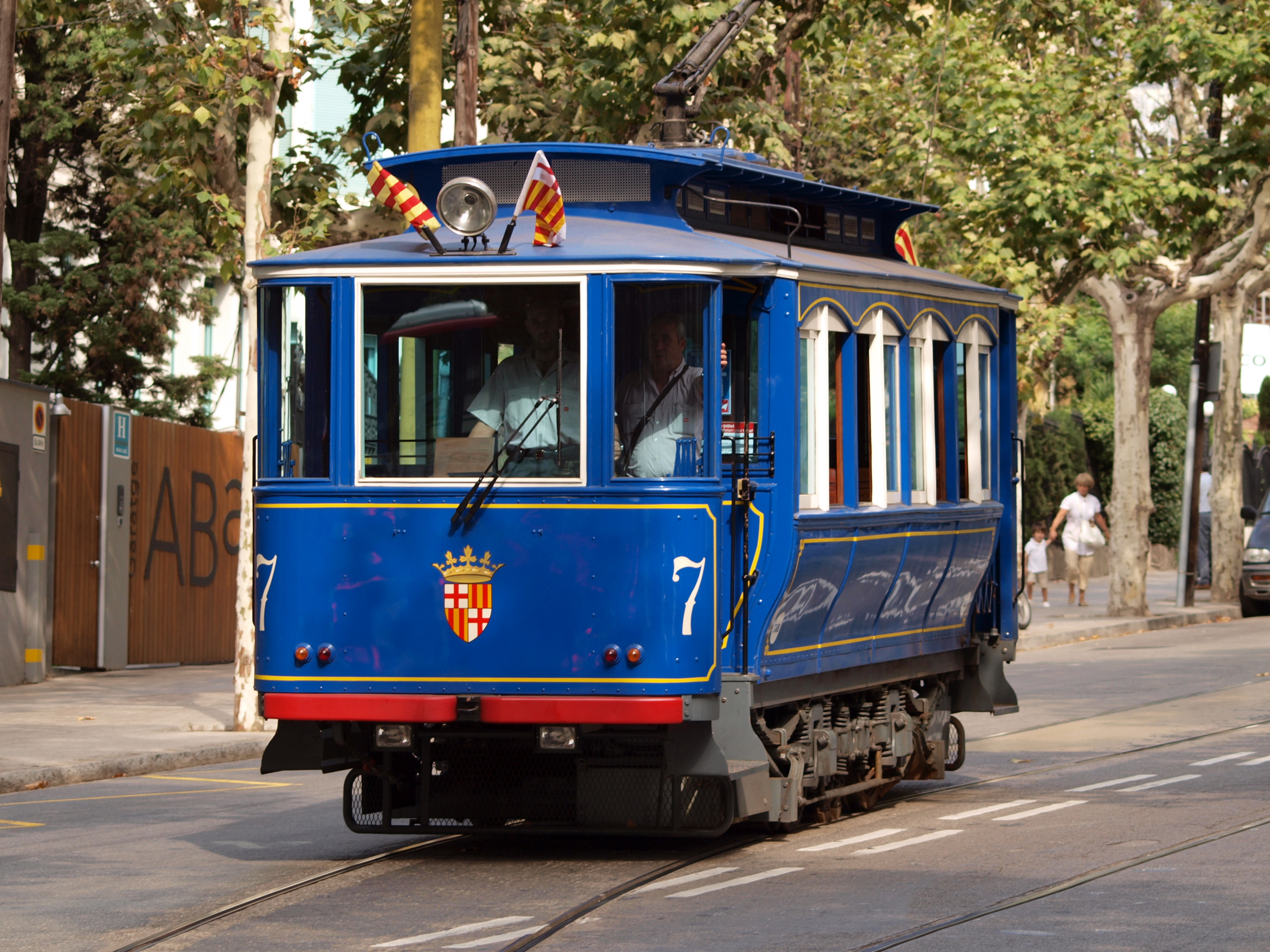

Overview
- Service type: Tramway
- Status: Service suspended since 2018
- Locale: Barcelona

Route
- Termini: Plaça Kennedy (Avenida Tibidabo metro station); Plaça del Doctor Andreu (Funicular del Tibidabo)
- Distance travelled: 1.276 kilometres (0.793 mi)

Technical
- Track gauge: 1,435 mm (4 ft 8 1/2 in) standard gauge
- Track owner: Transports Metropolitans de Barcelona

The Tramvia Blau (Catalan: blue tramway) is one of Barcelona's three tram systems. It is a 1.276 kilometres (0.793 mi) long heritage streetcar line serving a hilly area of the Sarrià-Sant Gervasi district between the terminus of FGC Barcelona Metro L7 and the Funicular del Tibidabo.

The Tramvia Blau is operated by Transports Metropolitans de Barcelona (TMB) but it is not part of Autoritat del Transport Metropolità (ATM) integrated fare network. Tickets must be purchased from the tram conductor.

The Tramvia Blau is one of only two first generation tramways to survive in Spain, along with the Tranvía de Sóller on the island of Mallorca. It has been closed for planned reconstruction since January 2018, but by 2020 the work had still not begun. Five years later, in November 2025, the mayor of Barcelona announced renewed plans to rebuild and reopen the tram line, in conjunction with work to reconstruct Tibidabo Avenue to add new storm-water ducts under the street. Design work for the latter project is not expected to be completed until 2027.

== History ==
The line was built at the instigation of Dr. Salvador Andreu, who was building a residential project around the axis of the Tibidabo Avenue, and was inaugurated in 1901. The line connected at Plaça Kennedy with trams of Barcelona's city system, but was independently owned. The line's own distinctive blue livery soon led to it becoming known as the Tramvia Blau.

The line underwent several changes in 1922 and 1958.

In 1954, line 7 of the Barcelona Metro was opened to Avinguda Tibidabo station under Plaça Kennedy, providing another connection to central Barcelona. However, in the 1960s the city trams were withdrawn from Plaça Kennedy, cutting the Tramvia Blau off from the city network.

In 1971 the remaining tram routes of the Tranvías de Barcelona company were closed. However, the separately owned Tramvia Blau remained in operation. It continued in private ownership until 1979, when it was taken over by the city, who continued to operate it. Between 1971 and 2004, when the second generation Trambaix and Trambesòs lines opened, it was the only tram route in the city.

Operation ceased on 28 January 2018, pending planned reconstruction that did not proceed. Rebuilding may now begin in conjunction with a project to rebuild Avenida Tibidabo starting in 2027 or 2028, but there are no firm plans yet.

== Operation ==
=== Infrastructure ===
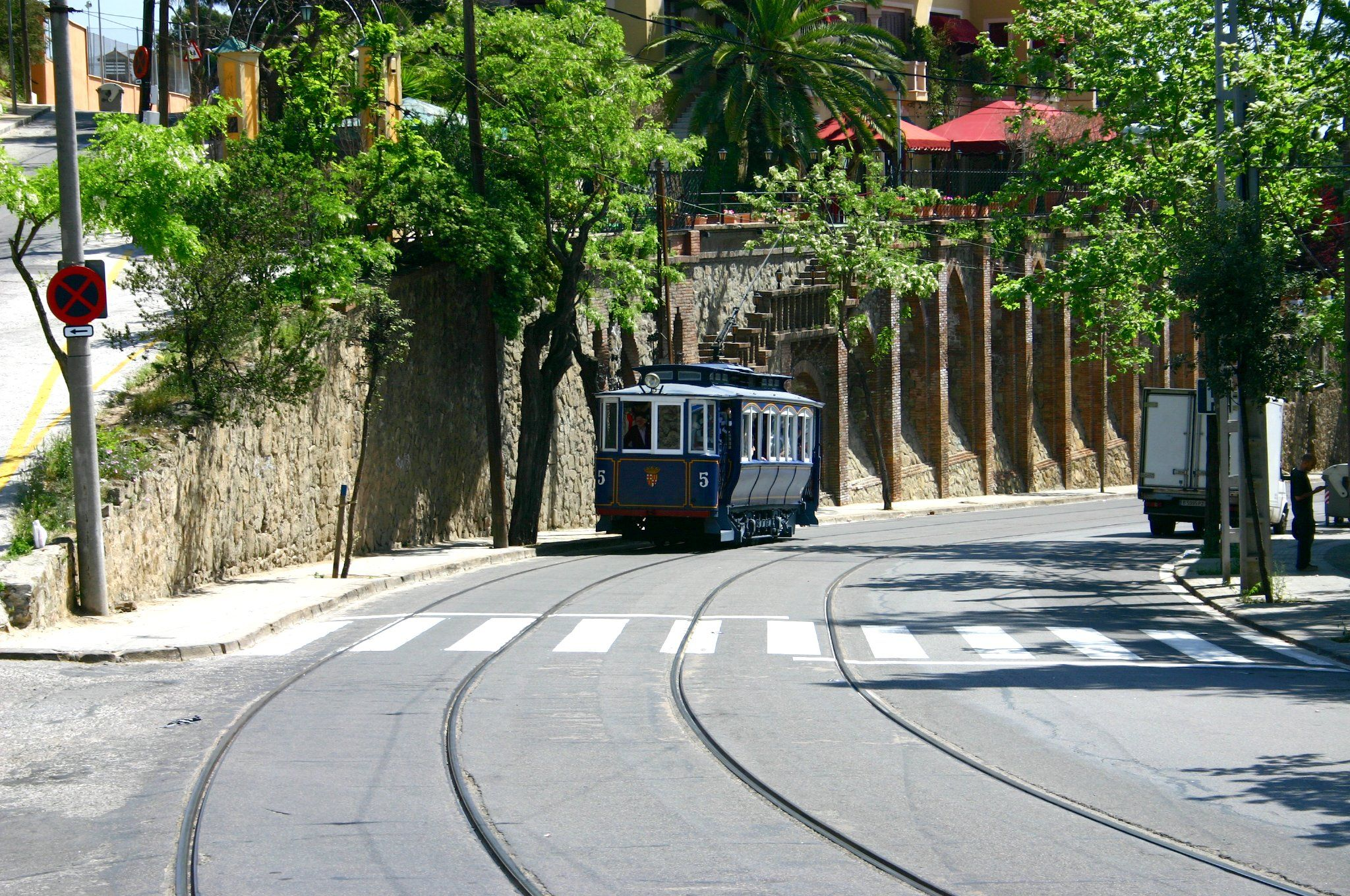
Typical Tramvia Blau street track

The Tramvia Blau is 1.276 kilometres (0.793 mi) long, climbing a vertical distance of 93 metres (305 ft) at a maximum gradient of 8%. It is constructed to 1,435 mm (4 ft 8 1/2 in) gauge and is double track, apart from single track stub terminals at each terminus. It runs in the Avinguda Tibidabo throughout, and is not segregated from other traffic.

The line's depot is accessed by some 100 metres (330 ft) of single track, which is not used in passenger service. The depot branch joins the main line near its midpoint, adjacent to the bridge carrying the Avinguda Tibidabo over the Ronda de Dalt.

The line serves the following stops:

Uphill
- Plaça Kennedy
- Román Macaya
- Josep Garí
- Lluís Muntadas
- Font del Racó
- Plaça del Doctor Andreu
Downhill
- Plaça del Doctor Andreu
- Carrer número 15
- Adrià Margarit
- Bosch i Alsina
- Josep Mª Florensa
- Plaça Kennedy

=== Tram fleet ===
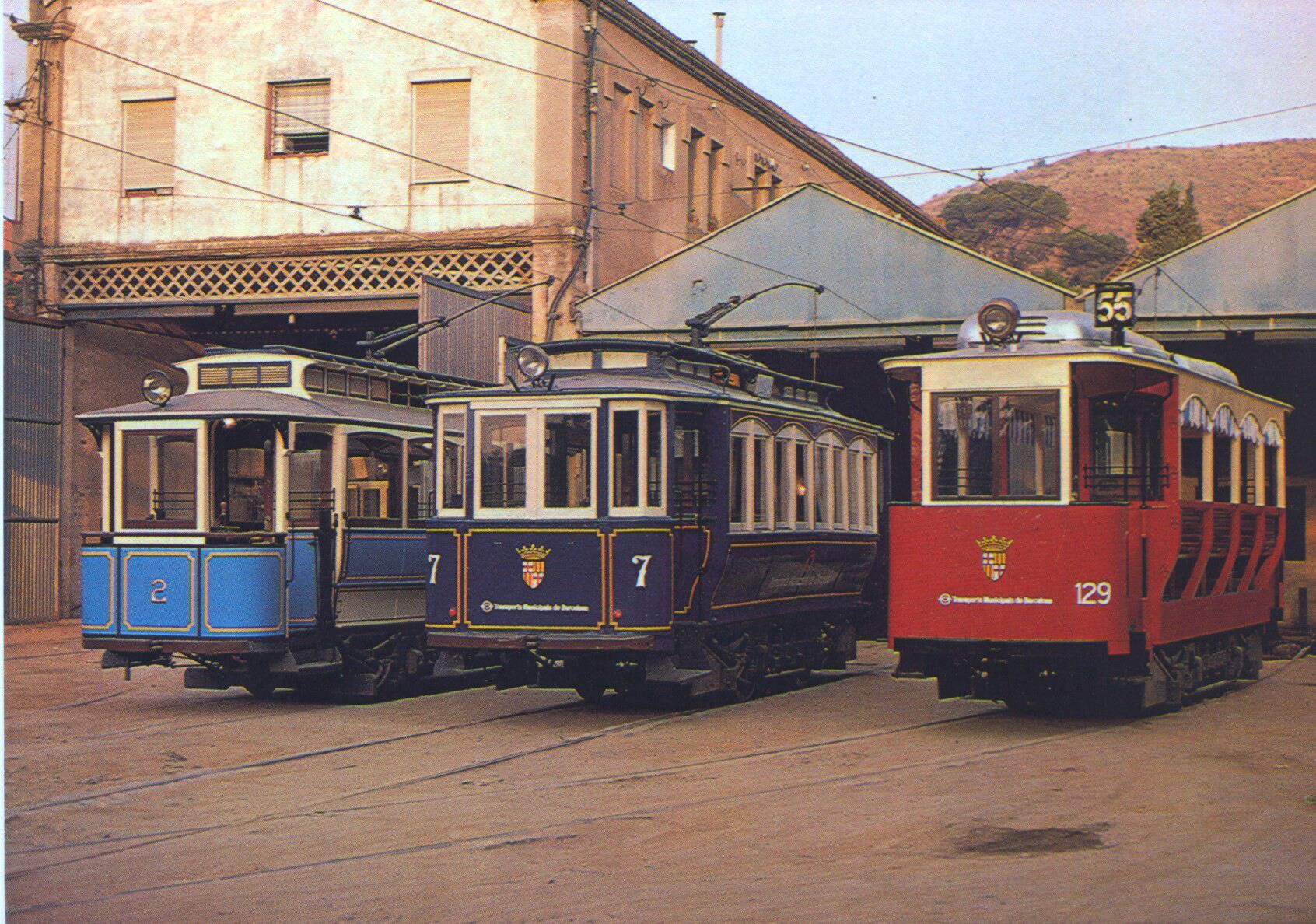
Cars 2, 7 and 129 posed in front of the depot in 2005. Car 7 is in its pre-rebuilt condition, as can be seen by comparison with the image at the head of this article.

The line is operated with a fleet of seven historic tram cars:

| Image | Number | Year | Notes |
|---|---|---|---|
| | 2 | 1901 | The only survivor of a class of four trams built for the opening of the Tramvia Blau. Is operable, but only used on special occasions. |
| | 5, 8, 10 | 1904 | Members of a further class of six four-wheeled trams built for service on the Tramvia Blau. The cars are double-ended, with two doors on each side with manually operated gates. Each car has a capacity for 32 seated passengers, and has a maximum speed of 13 km/h (8.1 mph). |
| | 6, 7 | 1904 | Members of the same class as 5, 8 and 10, but rebuilt in 2005 to 2006. The rebuilt cars retain their original layout and propulsion, with the addition of hydraulic brakes. |
| | 129 | 1906 | Open car originally built for the Barcelona city system. Restored in 1986, using the truck from Tramvia Blau tram 9, of the same class as 5-8 and 10. Painted in the traditional red of the Barcelona city system rather than the blue of the Tramvia Blau. |

== See also ==
- Trambaix
- Trambesòs
